Military vehicles include all land combat and transport vehicles, excluding rail-based, which are designed for or are in significant use by military forces throughout the world.

See also list of armoured fighting vehicles.

# 
 0-10 Light tank (Soviet Union; pre-World War II)
 10TP light cruiser prototype (Poland; pre-World War II)
 14TP medium cruiser prototype (Poland; pre-World War II)
 1V152 8×8 command and forward observation vehicle based on the BTR-80 (Soviet Union; Cold War/Modern)
 20/25TP medium tank concept (Poland; pre-World War II)
 2K22 Tunguska Soviet tracked Self-propelled Anti-Aircraft Weapon (Soviet Union; Cold War/Modern)
 2S1 Gvozdika shhhuj 122mm howitzer (also known as M1971 and M1974) (Soviet Union; Cold War)
 2S3 Akatsiya self-propelled 152mm howitzer (also known as M1973) (Soviet Union; Cold War)
 2S4 Tyulpan self-propelled 240mm mortar (also known as M1975) (Soviet Union; Cold War)
 2S5 Giatsint-S self-propelled 152mm howitzer (also known as M1981) (Soviet Union; Cold War/Modern)
 2S7 Pion self-propelled 203mm gun (also known as M1975) (Soviet Union; Cold War)
 2S9 Anona self-propelled 120mm mortar (Soviet Union; Cold War/Modern)
 2S14 Zhalo-S 8×8 self-propelled 85mm anti-tank gun based on the BTR-70  (Soviet Union; Cold War/Modern)
 2S15 Norov self-propelled 100mm anti-tank gun based on the 2S1. (Soviet Union; Cold War)
 2S19 Msta self-propelled 152mm howitzer (Soviet Union; Cold War/Modern)
 2S23 Nona-SVK 8×8 self-propelled 120mm mortar based on the BTR-80 (Soviet Union; Cold War/Modern)
 2S30 Iset self-propelled 155mm howitzer (Soviet Union; Modern)
 2S31 Vena self-propelled 120mm mortar based on the BMP-3 (Soviet Union; Modern)
 40.10 4×4 utility vehicle (also known as LSVW and Torpedo) produced by Iveco (Italy; Cold War/Modern)
 4K 4FA armoured vehicle (Austria; Cold War)
 4K 7FA armoured vehicle (Austria; Cold War)
 4TP light tank prototype (Poland; pre-World War II)
 7TP light tank (Poland; World War II)
 9A51 Prima 6×6 self-propelled multiple rocket launcher based on a ZIL-131 chassis (Soviet Union; Cold War)
 9P117 8×8 transport/launcher of the Scud short-range ballistic missile (also known as the MAZ-543) (Soviet Union; Cold War)
 9P157 self-propelled anti-tank vehicle with 9M123 Khrizantema missiles based on the BMP-3 (Soviet Union; Modern)
 9P162 self-propelled anti-tank vehicle with 9M133 Kornet missiles based on the BMP-3 (Soviet Union; Modern)
 9S482 designation for the PU-12M 8×8 air defence command vehicle (Soviet Union; Cold War/Modern)
 9TP light tank (Poland; World War II)
 15cwt truck series (British; World War II)

A 
 A4 AVL 4×4 armoured utility vehicle (France; Modern)
 A7SC 4×2 armoured car (United States; pre–World War II)
 A7V heavy tank (Sturmpanzerwagen) (Germany; World War I)
 A9 Cruiser Tank Mark I medium tank (United Kingdom; pre–World War II)
 A10 Cruiser Tank Mark II medium tank (United Kingdom; pre–World War II)
 A11 Infantry Tank Mark I light tank (United Kingdom; pre–World War II)
 A12 Infantry Tank Mark II light tank (United Kingdom; pre–World War II)
 A13 Cruiser Tank Mark III medium tank (United Kingdom; pre–World War II)
 A13 Cruiser Tank Mark IV medium tank (United Kingdom; pre–World War II)
 A13 Covenanter Cruiser Tank Mark V medium tank (United Kingdom; pre–World War II)
 A15 Crusader Cruiser Tank Mark VI medium tank (United Kingdom; World War II)
 A22 Churchill Infantry Tank Mark IV medium tank (United Kingdom; World War II)
 A24 Cavalier Cruiser Tank Mark VII medium tank (United Kingdom; World War II)
 A27 Cromwell Cruiser Tank Mark VIII medium tank (United Kingdom; World War II)
 A30 Challenger Cruiser Tank Mark VIII medium tank (United Kingdom; World War II)
 A34 Comet Cruiser Tank medium tank (United Kingdom; World War II)
 A39 Tortoise anti-tank vehicle (United Kingdom; World War II)
 A43 Black Prince Infantry Tank medium tank (United Kingdom;)
 A41 Centurion main battle tank (United Kingdom; Cold War)
 A45 Caernarvon heavy tank (also known as the FV201 and FV221) (United Kingdom; World War II)
 A-531 armoured personnel carrier (also known as the Type 63 or YW531) (China; Cold War)
 AAV-7 amphibious armoured vehicle series (United States; Cold War)
 AAVC-7 amphibious command vehicle (United States; Cold War)
 AAVP-7 amphibious armoured personnel carrier (United States; Cold War)
 AAVR-7 amphibious recovery vehicle (United States; Cold War)
 AB 40 4×4 armoured car (Italy; World War II)
 AB 41 4×4 armoured car (Italy; World War II)
 Abrams (popular name for the M1 Abrams)
 AC1 Sentinel medium tank (also known as the Cruiser Tank Mk I) (Australia; World War II)
 ACEC Cobra armoured personnel carrier (Belgium; Cold War/Modern)
 ACG-1 light tank (also known as the AMC 35) (France; pre–World War II)
 ACG-2 self-propelled anti-tank 75mm gun (also known as the AMC 35) (France; pre–World War II)
 Achzarit armoured personnel carrier based on the T-54/55 chassis (Israel; Cold War/Modern)
 ACTL, Italian transport vehicle
 ACV 300 infantry fighting vehicle based on the AIFV (Turkey; Modern)
 ACV-S armoured vehicle based on the AIFV (Turkey; Modern)
 AHSVS 8×8 armoured truck series (Germany; Modern)
 AIFV infantry fighting vehicle based on the M113 (Turkey and United States; Cold War/Modern)
 Al-Fao self-propelled 210mm howitzer (Iraq; Cold War/Modern)
 Al-Khalid reporting name for the MBT 2000 main battle tank (China and Pakistan; Modern)
 Al-Zarar MBT main battle tank based on the T-59 (Pakistan; Modern)
 Alacran (popular name for the BMS-1 Alacran)
 Alvis-Straussler (Uk; World War II)
 Alvis Striker SP ATGW Vehicle (Uk; Modern)
 AM-IV 4×4 armoured security vehicle (Brazil; Modern)
 AMC 34 light tank (also known as the ACG-1) (France; pre–World War II)
 AMC 35 light tank (also known as the ACG-1) (France; pre–World War II)
 AML 20 4×4 armoured car (France; Cold War)
 AML 60 4×4 armoured car (France and South Africa; Cold War)
 AML 90 4×4 armoured car (France and South Africa; Cold War)
 AML 245 4×4 armoured car (France; Cold War)
 AMR 33 light tank (France; pre–World War II)
 AMR 35 light tank (France; pre–World War II)
 Amtrac common name for the American LVT series of amphibious vehicles
 AMV 8×6 armoured vehicle (Finland; Modern)
 AMX-10P armoured personnel carrier (France; Cold War)
 AMX-10RC 6×6 armoured fighting vehicle (France; Cold War)
 AMX-13 light tank (France; Cold War)
 AMX 30 main battle tank (France; Cold War)
 AMX 32 main battle tank (France; Cold War)
 AMX 40 main battle tank (France; Cold War/Modern)
 AMX-56 main battle tank (designation sometimes used for the Leclerc) (France; Modern)
 AMX-VCI infantry fighting vehicle (France; Cold War)
 APRA-21 4×4 self-propelled multiple rocket launcher based on a Bucegi SR-114 chassis (Romania; Cold War)
 APRA-40 6×6 self-propelled multiple rocket launcher based on a DAC-665T chassis (Romania)
 APS-3 armored personnel carrier (Indonesia; Modern)
 Archer (tank destroyer) (United Kingdom; World War II)
 Ariete (popular name for the C1 Ariete)
 Arjun MBT main battle tank (India; Modern)
 Arma Amphibious tactical wheeled armoured vehicle (Turkey; Modern)
 Armadillo wood and gravel extemporised AFV (United Kingdom; World War II)
 Armored Combat Earthmover (project name for the M9 ACE)
 Armored Gun System (project name for the XM8 AGS)
 Armored Infantry Fighting Vehicle (project name for the AIFV)
 ATS 56 G, Soviet artillery tractor used in the Vietnam War
 Armoured Vehicle Launched Bridge (AVLB)
 ASCOD series of armoured vehicles (Austria and Spain; Modern)
 ASLAV 8×8 infantry fighting vehicle based on the LAV 25 (Australia and Canada; Modern)
 Asad Babil (Iraqi designation for license-built T-72)
 ASU-57 self-propelled 57mm gun (Soviet Union; Cold War)
 ASU-85 self-propelled 85mm gun (Soviet Union; Cold War)
 AT105 Saxon wheeled armoured personnel carrier (United Kingdom; Cold War)
 AT-P tracked prime mover and artillery crew transporter (Soviet Union; Cold War)
 Austin Armoured Car (United Kingdom; World War I)
 Avenger air defence vehicle based on the HMMWV (United States; Modern)
 AVGP Cougar wheeled fire support vehicle (Canada; Cold War)
 AVGP Grizzly wheeled armoured personnel carrier (Canada; Cold War)
 AVGP Husky wheeled maintenance and recovery vehicle (Canada; Cold War)

B 
 B1 Centauro 8×8 tank destroyer (Italy; Modern)
 B-531 armoured personnel carrier (also known as the Type 63 or YW531) (China; Cold War)
 BA-3 6×4 armoured car (Soviet Union; pre–World War II)
 BA-6 6×4 armoured car (Soviet Union; pre–World War II)
 BA-10 6×4 armoured car (Soviet Union; pre–World War II)
 BA-64 4×4 armoured car (Soviet Union; World War II)
 Bateleur 4×4 self-propelled multiple rocket launcher based on a SAMIL 20 truck (South Africa; Modern)
 BDX 4×4 armoured personnel carrier (Belgium; Cold War)
 Bison concrete armoured lorry (United Kingdom; World War II)
 Bison 8×8 armoured personnel carrier (Canada; modern)
 BJ2020 4×4 utility vehicle based on the Jeep Cherokee (XJ) (China; Cold War / modern)
 BJ2022 Brave Warrior 4×4 utility vehicle (China; modern)
 BJ212 Beijing Jeep 4×4 utility vehicle based on the UAZ-469 (China; Cold War / modern)
 Black Eagle Tank (Russian:Chorny Oriol) main battle tank (Russia; modern)
 Black Knight (Unmanned combat vehicle)
 Black Panther (popular name for the K2 Black Panther)
 BLG-60 bridging vehicle (East Germany/Poland; Cold War)
 BLG-67 bridging vehicle (East Germany/Poland; Cold War)
 Blitz (popular name for the C15)
 BLR 4×4 armoured personnel carrier (Spain; Cold War)
 BM-11 6×6 self-propelled multiple rocket launcher based on a Ural-375D or Ural-4320 chassis (North Korea; Cold War)
 BM-21 Grad 4×4 and 6×6 self-propelled multiple rocket launcher based on a GAZ-66, Ural-375D, Ural-4320 or ZIL-131 chassis (also known as M1964) (Soviet Union; Cold War)
 BMD-1 infantry fighting vehicle (Soviet Union; Cold War)
 BMD-2 infantry fighting vehicle (Soviet Union; Cold War)
 BMD-3 infantry fighting vehicle (Russia; modern)
 BMM-2 8×8 ambulance based on the K1Sh1 (Russia; modern)
 BMM-3 8×8 ambulance based on the K1Sh1 (Russia; modern)
 BMM-80 8×8 ambulance based on the K1Sh1 (Russia; Modern)
 BMP-1 infantry fighting vehicle (Soviet Union; Cold War)
 BMP-2 infantry fighting vehicle (Soviet Union; Cold War/Modern)
 BMP-3 infantry fighting vehicle (Russia; Modern)
 BMP-23 infantry fighting vehicle based on the MT-LB (Bulgaria; Cold War/Modern)
 BMP-30 infantry fighting vehicle based on the BMP-23 (Bulgaria; Modern)
 BMR mine clearing vehicle (Soviet Union; Cold War)
 BMR-600 6×6 armoured personnel carrier (also known as Pegaso 3560) (Spain; Cold War)
 BMS-1 Alacran halftrack armoured personnel carrier based on the M3 Halftrack (Chile; Cold War)
 Boragh armoured personnel carrier based on the Type 86 (Iran; Modern)
 BOV 4×4 armoured vehicle (Yugoslavia; Cold War)
 Bradley (popular name for the M2 Bradley and M3 Bradley)
 BRAVIA Commando Mk III armoured car (Portugal; Cold War)
 BRDM-1 4×4 reconnaissance vehicle (also known as M1958, M1959 and M1960) (Soviet Union; Cold War)
 BRDM-2 4×4 reconnaissance vehicle (Soviet Union; Cold War)
 BRDM-3 wheeled anti-tank vehicle (Soviet Union; Cold War)
 BREM-2 armored recovery vehicle based on the BMP-1 (Soviet Union; Cold War)
 BREM-L armored recovery vehicle based on the BMP-3  (Russia; Modern)
 BRM-23 reconnaissance vehicle (Bulgaria; Cold War/Modern)
 BT-2 light tank (Soviet Union; World War II)
 BT-5 light tank (Soviet Union; World War II)
 BT-7 light tank (Soviet Union; World War II)
 BT-8 light tank (Soviet Union; World War II)
 BTR-3 8×8 armoured personnel carrier (Ukraine; Modern)
 BTR-4 8×8 armoured personnel carrier (Ukraine; Modern)
 BTR-40 4×4 armoured personnel carrier (also known as M1956, M1957 and M1974/4) (Soviet Union; Cold War)
 BTR-50 tracked armoured personnel carrier (Soviet Union; Cold War)
 BTR-60 8×8 armoured personnel carrier (Soviet Union; Cold War)
 BTR-70 8×8 armoured personnel carrier (Soviet Union; Cold War)
 BTR-80 8×8 armoured personnel carrier (Soviet Union; Cold War/Modern)
 BTR-90 8×8 armoured personnel carrier (Russia; Modern)
 BTR-94 8×8 armoured personnel carrier (Ukraine; Modern)
 BTR-140 (more commonly known as the BTR-152 6×6 armoured personnel carrier) (Soviet Union; Cold War)
 BTR-152 6×6 armoured personnel carrier (Soviet Union; Cold War)
 BTR-T infantry fighting vehicle (Russia; Modern)
 BTS-1 armoured recovery vehicle (Soviet Union; Cold War)
 BTS-2 armoured recovery vehicle (Soviet Union; Cold War)
 BTS-3 armoured recovery vehicle (Soviet Union; Cold War)
 BTS-4 armoured recovery vehicle (Soviet Union; Cold War)
 Buffalo wheeled armoured personnel carrier (France; Cold War)
 Buffalo 6×6 anti-mine vehicle based on the Casspir (United States; modern)
 Buffalo (British designation of some of the American LVT series of amphibious vehicles)
 Buffel 4×4 mine protected armoured personnel carrier (South Africa; Cold War)
 Bushmaster 4×4 mine protected armoured personnel carrier (Australia; Modern)
 Bushmaster (designation used for the LVT-3 variant of the American LVT series of amphibious vehicles)
 Bv 202 articulated tractor and trailer (also known as the FV11021) (Sweden; Cold War)
 Bv 206 articulated tractor and trailer (Sweden; Cold War/Modern)
 BVP-1 infantry fighting vehicle based on the BMP-1 (Czechoslovakia; Cold War)
 BVP-2 infantry fighting vehicle based on the BMP-2 (Czechoslovakia; Cold War/Modern)
 BVP M-80 infantry fighting vehicle based on the M-80 (Yugoslavia; Cold War)
 BVS10 Viking articulated tractor and trailer (Sweden; modern)
 BVPzV Svatava reconnaissance vehicle based on the BMP-1 (Czechoslovakia; Cold War)
 BWP-1 (Polish designation of the BMP-1 infantry fighting vehicle (Soviet Union; Cold War)
 BWP-40 infantry fighting vehicle based on the BMP-1/ CV 90  (Poland and Sweden; modern)
 BWP-2000 infantry fighting vehicle based on the BMP-1 (Poland; modern)

C 
 C1 Ariete main battle tank (Italy; Modern)
 Celere Sahariano prototype medium tank (Italy; World war II)
 C8 Quad 4×4 tractor (United Kingdom; pre–World War II)
 C8 4×4 8-cwt truck series (Canada; World War II)
 C13 Dardo infantry fighting vehicle (also known as the VCC-80) (Italy; Modern)
 C15 4×2 and 4×4 15-cwt truck series (also known as the Blitz and 15cwt) (Canada; World War II)
 C30 4×4 30-cwt truck series (Canada; World War II)
 C60 4×4 and 6×6 60-cwt truck series (Canada; World War II)
 CA1 light tank (French; World War I)
 CA10 wheeled truck (China; Cold War)
 CA30 wheeled truck (China; Cold War)
 CA1091 4×2 5 ton truck (China; Cold War / modern)
 Camillino (popular name for the VCC-2 Camillino)
 Capraia (popular name for the R3 Capraia)
 Carden Loyd tankette (United Kingdom; World War II)
 Carro Armato  (tanks)
 Carro Leggero (popular name for the L6/40)
 Carro Pesante (popular name for the P40 and P26/40)
 Carro Veloce or ‘’fast tank’’ (popular name for the CV-29, CV-33 and CV-35)
 Cascavel (popular name for the EE-9 Cascavel)
 Casspir mine proof wheeled APC (South Africa; Cold War)
 Catapult self-propelled 130mm gun (India; modern)
 Cavalier (popular name for the A24 Cavalier also known as Cruiser Tank Mark VII)
 Cazador tracked TOW missile carrier (Spain; Cold War)
 CCKW, or GMC CCKW 6×6 2.5 ton truck  (also known as G-508) (United States; World War II)
 Centauro (popular name for the B1 Centauro 8×8 tank destroyer) (Italy; modern)
 Centurion (popular name for the A41 and FV4001 Centurion series)
 Chaffee (popular name for the M24 Chaffee)
 Chaimite wheeled armoured personnel carrier (Portugal; Cold War)
 Challenger (popular name for the A30 Cruiser Tank Mark VIII)
 Challenger 1 (popular name for the FV4030 Challenger)
 Challenger 2 (popular name for the FV4034 Challenger)
 Chaparral (popular name for the M48 Chaparral)
 Char 2C Alsace super-heavy tank (also known as FCM 2C) (France; pre–World War II)
 Char B1 medium tank (France; pre–World War II)
 Char D1 medium tank (France; pre–World War II)
 Char Léger Hotchkiss H-35 (official designation for the Hotchkiss H35)
 Char Mitrailleuse Renault FT-31 (official designation for the Renault FT-31)
 Charger (popular name for the RG-31)
 Chi-Ha (name for the Type 97 Chi-Ha)
 Chi-He (name for the Type 1 Chi-He)
 Chi-Nu (name for the Type 3 Chi-Nu)
 Chieftain (popular name for the FV4201 Chieftain)
 Ch'onma-ho main battle tank (North Korea;modern)
 CM-21 armoured personnel carrier based on the M113   (Taiwan; Cold War)
 Cobra (popular name for the ACEC Cobra)
 Combat Engineer Vehicle (program name for the M728 CEV)
 Comet (popular name for the A34 Comet I)
 Commando (popular name for the BRAVIA Commando Mk III)
 Commando (popular name for the Cadillac Gage V-100 Commando series)
 Commando Scout (popular name for the Cadillac Gage Commando Scout)
 Condor 4×4 armoured personnel carrier (Germany; Cold War)
 Conqueror (popular name for the FV214 Conqueror)
 Cougar (popular name for the AVGP Cougar)
 Covenanter (popular name for the A13 Cruiser Tank Mark V)
 Coyote Reconnaissance Vehicle (Canada; modern)
 CQ261 wheeled truck (China; Cold War)
 Cromwell (popular name for the A27 Cruiser Tank Mark VIII)
 Cruiser Tank Mk I medium tank (also known as the A9) (United Kingdom; pre–World War II (1938))
 Cruiser Tank Mk I medium tank (also known as the AC1) (Australia; World War II)
 Cruiser Tank Mk II medium tank (also known as the A10) (United Kingdom; World War II)
 Cruiser Tank Mk III medium tank (also known as the A13) (United Kingdom; World War II)
 Cruiser Tank Mk IV medium tank (also known as the A13) (United Kingdom; World War II)
 Cruiser Tank Mark V medium tank (also known as the A13 Covenanter) (United Kingdom; World War II)
 Cruiser Tank Mark VI medium tank (also known as the A15 Crusader) (United Kingdom; World War II)
 Cruiser Tank Mark VII medium tank (also known as the A24 Cavalier) (United Kingdom; World War II)
 Cruiser Tank Mark VIII medium tank (also known as the A27 Cromwell) (United Kingdom; World War II)
 Cruiser Tank Mark VIII medium tank (also known as the A30 Challenger) (United Kingdom; World War II)
 Crusader (popular name for the A15 Cruiser Tank Mark VI)
 CTLS light tank (also known as T14 and T15) (United States; (World War II)
 CV-29 (also known as the Carro Veloce) (designation for the Carden Loyd tankette)
 CV-33 light tank based on the CV-29 (also known as the Carro Veloce) (Italy; pre–World War II)
 CV-35 light tank based on the CV-33 (also known as the Carro Veloce and L3/35) (Italy; pre–World War II)
 CV 90 family of infantry fighting vehicles (Sweden; modern)
 CV 9025 infantry fighting vehicle version of the CV 90 (Sweden; modern)
 CV 9030 infantry fighting vehicle version of the CV 90 (Sweden; modern)
 CV 9035 infantry fighting vehicle version of the CV 90 (Sweden; modern)
 CV 9040 infantry fighting vehicle version of the CV 90 (Sweden; modern)
 CV 9056 anti-tank vehicle version of the CV 90 (Sweden; modern)
 CV 90105 light tank version of the CV 90 (Sweden; modern)
 CV 90120 light tank version of the CV 90 (Sweden; modern)
 Cultivator No. 6 trench forming machine (United Kingdom; World War II)

D 
 D421 cable carrier based on the Type 60 (China; Cold War)
 Dardo popular name for the C13 infantry fighting vehicle (also known as the VCC-80) (Italy; Modern)
 DAF ya4440/ya4442 Dutch transport truck
 DAF ya328 Dutch transport truck (1950–1980)
 DAF ya126 Dutch transport truck (1947–1960)
 DANA self-propelled 152mm howitzer (Czechoslovakia; Cold War)
 Dingo 4×4 armoured car (Australia; World War II)
 Dingo 4×4 armoured car (United Kingdom; World War II)
 Dozor-B 4×4 armoured car (Ukraine; Modern)
 DP-90 artillery reconnaissance vehicle based on the OT-90 (Czechoslovakia; Cold War)
 DPM convoy escort vehicle based on the T-55 (Soviet Union; Cold War)
 Dragoon 300 wheeled armoured fighting vehicle (United States; modern)
 DTP-90 maintenance vehicle based on the OT-90 (Czechoslovakia; Cold War)
 DUKW 6×6 amphibious utility vehicle (United States; World War II)
 Duster (unofficial name for the M42 Skysweeper)
 Dzik Armored Car (Poland; Modern)

E 
 EJDER 6×6 Armoured Wheeled Vehicle(Turkey)
 Eagle (Nigerian name for the Main Battle Tank Mk 3)
 EBR 8×8 reconnaissance vehicle (France; Cold War/modern)
 EE-3 Jararaca 4×4 light reconnaissance vehicle (Brazil; Cold War)
 EE-9 Cascavel 6×6 armoured car (Brazil; Cold War)
 EE-11 Urutu 6×6 armoured personnel carrier (Brazil; Cold War)
 EE-17 Sucuri 6×6 armoured car (Brazil; modern)
 EE-18 Sucuri II 6×6 armoured car (Brazil; modern)
 EE-T1 Osório main battle tank (Brazil; Cold War/Modern)
 EE-T2 Osório main battle tank (Brazil; Cold War/Modern)
 EE-T4 Ogum armoured fighting vehicle (Brazil; Cold War/Modern)
 EIFV infantry fighting vehicle based on the MTVL   (United States; Modern)
 Eland 4×4 armoured cars based on the AML (South Africa; Cold War)
 EQ1093 4×2 5 ton truck (China; Cold War)
 EQ1108 4×2 5 ton truck (China; Cold War)
 EQ1141 4×2 8 ton truck (China; Cold War)
 EQ2050 Mengshi 4×4 utility vehicle based on the HMMWV (also known as the Hanma) (China; modern)
 EQ2058 up-armoured EQ2050 4×4 utility vehicle (China; modern)
 EQ2061 4×4 1.5 ton truck (China; Cold War)
 EQ2081 6×6 2.5 ton truck (China; Cold War)
 EQ2082 6×6 2.5 ton truck (China; Cold War)
 EQ2100 6×6 3.5 ton truck (China; Cold War)
 EQ2102 6×6 3.5 ton truck (China; modern)
 ERC-1 (designation for the ERC-90 F4 Sagaie)
 ERC-2 (designation for the ERC-90 F4 Sagaie 2)
 ERC-20 Kriss 6×6 armoured car (France; Cold War)
 ERC-60 Sagaie 6×6 armoured car (France; Cold War)
 ERC-90 F1 Lynx 6×6 armoured car (France; Cold War)
 ERC-90 F4 Sagaie 6×6 armoured car (France; Cold War)
 ERC-90 F4 Sagaie 2 6×6 armoured car (France; Cold War / modern)

F 
 F8 4×2 8-cwt truck series (Canada; World War II)
 F15 4×2 and 4×4 15-cwt truck series (also known as the Blitz and 15cwt) (Canada; World War II)
 F30 4×4 30-cwt truck series (Canada; World War II)
 F60 4×4 and 6×4 60-cwt truck series (Canada; World War II)
 Family of Medium Tactical Vehicles (project name for the M1078 FMTV series)
 FCM 36 light tank (French; pre–World War II)
 Ferret FV711 armoured car (UK, modern)
 Fiat 2000 light tank (Italy; World War I)
 Fiat 3000 light tank (Italy; pre–World War II)
 Fiat 6614 wheeled armoured personnel carrier (Italy; Cold War)
 Fiat 6616 heavy armoured car (Italy; Cold War/modern)
 Field Artillery Ammunition Support Vehicle (project name for the M992 FAASV)
 Fire Support Vehicle (project name for the M981 FSV)
 Fabrique Nationale AS 24 (Belgium; Cold War)
 FN Tricar (Belgium; World War II)
 Ford FT-B Armored car (Poland; Polish-Soviet war)
 Fox armoured car (CVR (W) UK, modern
 Freccia
 FT-31 light tank (France; World War II)
 FCM 2C Alsace heavy tank (also known as Char 2C) (France; pre–World War II)
 Fuchs (popular name for the Transportpanzer 1)
 FUG 4×4 reconnaissance vehicle (Hungary; Cold War)
 FV101 Scorpion light tank (United Kingdom; Cold War)
 FV102 Striker self-propelled ATGM carrier (United Kingdom; Cold War)
 FV103 Spartan armoured specialist personnel carrier (United Kingdom; Cold War)
 FV104 Samaritan armoured ambulance (United Kingdom; Cold War)
 FV105 Sultan command vehicle (United Kingdom; Cold War)
 FV106 Samson armoured recovery vehicle (United Kingdom; Cold War)
 FV107 Scimitar light tank (United Kingdom; Cold War)
 FV120 Spartan self-propelled anti-tank vehicle with MILAN anti-tank launcher  (United Kingdom; Cold War)
 FV180 tractor (United Kingdom; Cold War)
 FV201 main battle tank (also known as the A45 Caernarvon) (United Kingdom; World War II)
 FV214 Conqueror main battle tank (United Kingdom; Cold War)
 FV219 armoured recovery vehicle based on the FV201 (United Kingdom; Cold War)
 FV221 medium tank based on the FV201 (United Kingdom; Cold War)
 FV222 Conqueror armoured recovery vehicle based on the FV214 Conqueror (United Kingdom; Cold War)
 FV400 tank
 FV401 Cambridge armoured personnel carrier
 FV402 tank
 FV420 armoured personnel carrier
 FV421 armoured cargo carrier
 FV422 armoured personnel carrier
 FV423 command vehicle
 FV424 armoured engineering vehicle
 FV425 armoured carrier
 FV426 anti-tank vehicle with Orange William HESH anti-tank missiles (United Kingdom; Cold War)
 FV431 armoured truck (United Kingdom; Cold War)
 FV432 armoured personnel carrier (United Kingdom; Cold War)
 FV433 Abbot self-propelled 105mm gun based on the FV432 chassis (United Kingdom; Cold War)
 FV434 armoured engineering vehicle based on the FV432 (United Kingdom; Cold War)
 FV435 Wavell communications vehicle
 FV436 {variant fitted with Green Archer radar} based on the FV432 (United Kingdom; Cold War)
 FV437{Pathfinder vehicle with snorkel gear} based on FV432
 FV438 Wavell self-propelled anti-tank vehicle based on the FV432 with a Swingfire anti-tank missile launcher (United Kingdom; Cold War)
 FV439 signals vehicle based on the FV432 (United Kingdom; Cold War)
 FV510 Warrior infantry fighting vehicle (United Kingdom; Cold War/Modern)
 FV511 Warrior command vehicle (United Kingdom; Cold War/Modern)
 FV512	Warrior armoured repair vehicle (United Kingdom; Cold War/Modern)
 FV513	Warrior armoured recovery vehicle (United Kingdom; Cold War/Modern)
 FV514	Warrior reconnaissance vehicle (United Kingdom; Cold War/Modern)
 FV515	Warrior artillery command vehicle (United Kingdom; Cold War/Modern)
 FV601 Saladin armoured car (United Kingdom; Cold War)
 FV603 Saracen 6×6 armoured personnel carrier (United Kingdom; Cold War)
 FV604 Saracen 6×6 armoured personnel carrier (United Kingdom; Cold War)
 FV610 6×6 command vehicle based on the FV604 Saracen  (United Kingdom; Cold War)
 FV611 6×6 ambulance based on the FV604 Saracen  (United Kingdom; Cold War)
 FV621 Stalwart amphibious 6×6 5 ton truck (also known as the Stolly) (United Kingdom; Cold War)
 FV622 Stalwart amphibious 6×6 5 ton truck (also known as the Stolly) (United Kingdom; Cold War)
 FV623 Stalwart amphibious 6×6 5 ton artillery supply vehicle (also known as the Stolly) (United Kingdom; Cold War)
 FV624 Stalwart amphibious 6×6 5 ton recovery vehicle (also known as the Stolly) (United Kingdom; Cold War)
 FV711 Ferret 4×4 armoured car (United Kingdom; Cold War)
 FV721 Fox 4×4 armoured car (United Kingdom; Cold War)
 FV1600 Humber 1 ton 4×4 truck (United Kingdom; Cold War)
 FV1601 Humber 1 ton 4×4 truck (United Kingdom; Cold War)
 FV1604 Humber 1 ton 4×4 truck (United Kingdom; Cold War)
 FV1606 Humber 1 ton 4×4 wrecker/tow truck (United Kingdom; Cold War)
 FV1609 Humber 1 ton 4×4 armoured vehicle based on the Humber 1 ton truck (also known as the Pig) (United Kingdom; Cold War)
 FV1611 Humber 1 ton 4×4 armoured vehicle based on the Humber 1 ton truck (also known as the Pig) (United Kingdom; Cold War)
 FV1612 Humber 1 ton 4×4 armoured vehicle (United Kingdom; Cold War)
 FV1801A The Austin Champ 4x4 1/4ton CT/GS cargo (United Kingdom; Cold War)
 FV1620 Humber 1 ton 4×4 anti-tank vehicle with Malkara missiles based on the FV1611 (Australia and United Kingdom; Cold War)
 FV3801 tractor based on the Centurion (United Kingdom; Cold War)
 FV3802 self-propelled 25pdr gun based on the Centurion chassis (United Kingdom; Cold War)
 FV3803 command vehicle based on the Centurion (United Kingdom; Cold War)
 FV3804 ammunition supply vehicle based on the Centurion chassis (United Kingdom; Cold War)
 FV3805 self-propelled 140mm gun based on the Centurion chassis (United Kingdom; Cold War)
 FV3806 self-propelled 183mm gun based on the Centurion chassis (United Kingdom; Cold War)
 FV3901 bridge layer based on the Churchill chassis (United Kingdom; World War II/Cold War)
 FV3902 based on the Churchill (United Kingdom; World War II/Cold War)
 FV3903 armoured engineering vehicle based on the Churchill (United Kingdom; World War II/Cold War)
 FV3904 armoured personnel carrier based on the Churchill (United Kingdom; World War II/Cold War)
 FV4001 Centurion main battle tank (United Kingdom; Cold War)
 FV4002 Centurion AVLB bridging vehicle (United Kingdom; Cold War)
 FV4003 Centurion AVRE combat engineer vehicle (United Kingdom; Cold War)
 FV4004 Conway main battle tank based on the Centurion (United Kingdom; Cold War)
 FV4005 self-propelled anti-tank gun based on the Centurion chassis (United Kingdom; Cold War)
 FV4006 Centurion ARV armoured recovery vehicle (United Kingdom; Cold War)
 FV4007 Centurion Mk 1, 2, 3, 4, 7 and 8 main battle tank (United Kingdom; Cold War)
 FV4008 Centurion (United Kingdom; Cold War)
 FV4009 medium tank (United Kingdom; Cold War)
 FV4010 anti-tank vehicle with	Malkara missiles based on the Centurion chassis (United Kingdom; Cold War)
 FV4011 Centurion Mk 5 main battle tank (United Kingdom; Cold War)
 FV4012 Centurion Mk 7 main battle tank (United Kingdom; Cold War)
 FV4013 armoured recovery vehicle based on the Centurion (United Kingdom; Cold War)
 FV4014 medium tank (United Kingdom; Cold War)
 FV4015 Centurion Mk 9 main battle tank (United Kingdom; Cold War)
 FV4016 bridge layer based on the Centurion chassis (United Kingdom; Cold War)
 FV4017 Centurion Mk 10 main battle tank (United Kingdom; Cold War)
 FV4018 amphibious armoured recovery based on the Centurion (United Kingdom; Cold War)
 FV4019 bulldozer based on the Centurion chassis (United Kingdom; Cold War)
 FV4030 Challenger main battle tank (United Kingdom; Cold War/Modern)
 FV4034 Challenger 2 main battle tank (United Kingdom; Modern)
 FV4101 Charioteer medium tank, based on the Cromwell (United Kingdom; World War II/Cold War)
 FV4201 Chieftain main battle tank (United Kingdom; Cold War)
 FV4202 Centurion main battle tank (United Kingdom; Cold War)
 FV4203 armoured engineering vehicle	based on the Centurion (United Kingdom; Cold War)
 FV4204 Chieftain ARV armoured recovery vehicle (United Kingdom; Cold War)
 FV4205 Chieftain AVLB bridging vehicle (United Kingdom; Cold War)
 FV4207 VHF based on the Centurion tank	(United Kingdom; Cold War)
 FV4211 prototype tank (United Kingdom; Cold War)
 FV4333 Stormer armoured personnel carrier (United Kingdom; Cold War)
 FV4401 prototype main battle tank similar to the Stridsvagn 103 (United Kingdom; Cold War)
 FV4501 armoured mine clearer (United Kingdom; Cold War)
 FV4601 prototype main battle tank (also known as the MBT-80) (United Kingdom; Cold War)
 FV11021 articulated tractor and trailer (also known as the Bv 202) (Sweden; Cold War)
 FV18001 4x4 1/4ton Cargo based on the Land Rover Series I including 80", 86" and 107" wheelbase (United Kingdom; Cold War)
 FV18003 4x4 1/4 ton Airfield Lighting Maintenance, based on the Land Rover Series I 86" wheelbase (United Kingdom; Cold War)
 FV18004 4x4 Command Car, based on the Land Rover Series I 107" station wagon (United Kingdom; Cold War)
 FV18005 4×4 2-stretcher Ambulance based on the Land Rover Series I 107" station wagon chassis (United Kingdom; Cold War)
 FV18006 4x4 SAS Reconnaissance Vehicle based on the Land Rover Series I 86" wheelbase (United Kingdom; Cold War)
 FV18007 4x4 and 4x2 1/4ton Cargo and Utility based on the Land Rover Series I 88"/109" plus a special 2WD version of the 88" (United Kingdom; Cold War)
 FV18008 4×4 4-stretcher ambulance based on the Land Rover Series I 107" station wagon chassis (United Kingdom; Cold War)
 FV18009 4x4 Vehicle to tow and support the MOBAT 120mm based on the FV18007 88" wheelbase GS
 FV18044 4×4 ambulance based on the Land Rover Series II (United Kingdom; Cold War)
 FV18067 4×4 ambulance based on the Land Rover Series IIA and III (United Kingdom; Cold War)

G 
G-507 6x6 1.5 ton truck (also known as the WC-62 and the WC-63 when equipped with a winch)(United States; World War II)
 G-508 6×6 2.5 ton truck (also known as the CCKW) (United States; World War II)
 G-630 6×6 2.5 ton truck (also known as the US-6) (United States; World War II)
 G-651 6×6 2.5 ton truck (also known as the M-5H-6) (United States; World War II)
 G-1400 4×4 1.5 ton truck series (United States; pre–World War II)
 G-7100 4×4 1.5 ton truck series (United States; pre–World War II)
 G-7117 4×4 1.5 ton truck series (United States; World War II)
 Gadfly (popular name for the SA-11)
 Gainful (popular name for the SA-6)
 Gauntlet (popular name for the SA-15)
 Gecko (popular name for the SA-8)
 Ganef (popular name for the SA-4)
 Gaskin (popular name for the SA-9)
 GAZ-46 4×4 amphibious 
utility vehicle (Soviet Union; World War II)
 GAZ-61 4×4 utility vehicle (Soviet Union; Cold War)
 GAZ-63 wheeled truck (Soviet Union; Cold War)
 GAZ-64 4×4 utility vehicle (Soviet Union; World War II)
 GAZ-66 4×4 utility vehicle (Soviet Union; Cold War)
 GAZ-69 4×4 utility vehicle (also known as UAZ-69) (Soviet Union; Cold War)
 GAZ-5903 designation for the BTR-80 8×8 armoured personnel carrier (Soviet Union; Cold War)
 GAZ-59031 designation for the GAZ-5903 8×8 command vehicle (Soviet Union; Cold War)
 GAZ-59032 designation for the GAZ-5903 8×8 command vehicle (Soviet Union; Cold War)
 GAZ-59033 designation for the BREM-K 8×8 armoured recovery vehicle (Soviet Union; Cold War)
 GAZ-59034 designation for the GAZ-5903 8×8 infantry fighting vehicle (Soviet Union; Cold War)
 GAZ-59039 designation for the GAZ-5903 8×8 ambulance (Russia; modern)
 GAZ-3937 Vodnik 4×4 armoured vehicle (Russia; Modern)
 GAZ-39344 SIAM 4×4 reconnaissance vehicle (Russia; modern)
 GCT self-propelled 155mm artillery (France; Cold War/modern)
 Golan Armored Vehicle IFV/MRAP (United States/Israel; modern)
 Gopher (popular name for the SA-13)
 GPA  4×4 amphibious utility vehicle (United States; World War II)
 GPW 4×4 Utility Vehicle (United States; World War II)
 Grad (popular name for the BM-21)
 Grenadier (popular name for the MOWAG Grenadier)
 Grizzly (popular name for the AVGP Grizzly)
 Grizzly (tank) Medium tank.  Based on the M4 Sherman tank. (Canada; World War II)
 Grizzly APC by Xe
 GT-M tracked armoured personnel carrier (Soviet Union; Cold War)
 GT-MU tracked command and control vehicle (Soviet Union; Cold War)
 Guardian (popular name for the M117 Guardian)
 Gun Carrier Mark I self-propelled artillery (United Kingdom; World War I)
 G-Wagen 4×4 utility vehicle (West Germany; Cold War)

H 
 HS.30 armoured personnel carrier (West Germany; Cold War)
 Ha-Go (company name for the Type 95 Ha-Go)
 Heavy Expanded Mobility Ammunition Trailer (project name for the M983 HEMAT)
 Heavy Expanded Mobility Tactical Truck (project name for the M977 HEMTT series)
 Hellcat (popular name for the M18 Hellcat)
 Humvee (project name for the M998 HMMWV series)
 High Mobility Artillery Rocket System (HIMARS)
 HLVW 6×6 truck series based on the Steyr Percheron truck chassis (Canada; Cold War/Modern)
 Ho-Ro (name for the Type 38 Ho-Ro)
 H35 light tank (France; pre–World War II)
 H39 light tank (France; pre–World War II)
 Hotchkiss M201 light utility truck, (France; post World War II)
 Hotspur armoured car and internal security vehicle
 Hotspur Hussar lengthened armoured personnel carrier version of the Hotspur for military use.
 Humber Armoured Car
 Humber Light Reconnaissance Car
 Humber Scout Car (United Kingdom; World War II)
 Humber one-ton APC
 Husky (popular name for the AVGP Husky)
 HWK 11 armoured personnel carrier (Germany; Cold War)
 HY472 6×6 truck tractor and trailer with a DF-21 medium range ballistic missile (also known HY4260 or Type 82) (China; Cold War)
 HY473 6×6 truck tractor (also known as the Type 82) (China; Cold War)
 HY2150 4×4 truck (also known as the HY473 or Type 82) (China; Cold War)
 HY4160 4×4 truck tractor (also known as the HY473 or Type 82) (China; Cold War)
 HY4191 4×4 truck tractor (also known as the HY473 or Type 82) (China; Cold War)
 HY4260 6×6 truck tractor and trailer with a DF-21 medium range ballistic missile (also known as the HY472 or Type 82) (China; Cold War)
 HY4310 8×8 truck tractor and trailer with a DF-31 intercontinental ballistic missile (also known as the HY472 or Type 82) (China; Cold War)
 HY4330 8×8 truck tractor and trailer with a DF-31 intercontinental ballistic missile (also known as the HY472 or Type 82) (China; Cold War)
 HY4390 8×8 truck tractor (also known as the HY473 or Type 82) (China; Cold War)
 HY4320 6×6 truck tractor (also known as the HY473 or Type 82) (China; Cold War)
 HY5270 6×6 truck tractor (also known as the HY473 or Type 82) (China; Cold War)
 HY5300 6×6 truck tractor (also known as the HY473 or Type 82) (China; Cold War)

I 
 IFVL infantry fighting vehicle based on the MTVL   (United States; Modern)
 Ikv 91 tracked tank destroyer (Sweden; Cold War)
 Iltis (popular name for the Type 183)
 International MXT-MV Possible HMMWV replacement armoured.
 Improved TOW Vehicle (project name for the M901 ITV)
 IMR combat engineer vehicle based on the T-55 chassis (Soviet Union; Cold War)
 IMR-2 combat engineer vehicle based on the T-72 chassis (Soviet Union; Cold War)
 Iosef Stalin series of heavy tanks (Soviet Union; World War II)
 IS-2 (designation for the Iosef Stalin)
 IS-3 (designation for the Iosef Stalin)
 IT-122 self-propelled 122mm gun based on the T-55 (Soviet Union; Cold War)
 IWT combat engineering vehicle based on the T-55 (Poland; Cold War)

J 
 Jackson (popular name for the M36 Jackson)
 Jagdpanzer Jaguar 1 self-propelled HOT missile vehicle (Germany; Cold War)
 Jagdpanzer Jaguar 2 self-propelled TOW missile vehicle (Germany; Cold War)
 Jagdpanzer Kanone tank destroyer (Germany; Cold War)
 Jagdpanzer Rakete self-propelled SS.11 missile vehicle (Germany; Cold War)
 Jaguar tank (main battle tank (International; modern))
 Jararaca (popular name for the EE-3 Jararaca)
 JN252 wheeled truck (China; Cold War)
 JS (alternate spelling for the Iosef Stalin series of tanks)
 JVTB-55A crane tank based on the T-55 chassis (Czechoslovakia; Cold War)
 Jakkals Jakkals Light Utility Vehicle (South Africa)

K 
 K1 main battle tank (also known as Type 88) (Korea; modern)
 K1Sh1 8×8 command post based on the BTR-80 (Soviet Union; Cold War)
 K2 Black Panther main battle tank (Korea; modern)
 K200 infantry fighting vehicle (also known as the KIFV) (South Korea; Cold War/Modern)
 K216 NBC reconnaissance vehicle based on the K200 (South Korea; Modern)
 K242 self-propelled 107mm mortar based on the K200 (South Korea; Modern)
 K263 self-propelled anti-aircraft vehicle with 20mm Vulcan air defence system based on the K200  (South Korea; Modern)
 K277 command vehicle based on the K200 (South Korea; Modern)
 K281 self-propelled 81mm mortar based on the K200 (South Korea; Modern)
 K288 armoured recovery vehicle based on the K200 (South Korea; Modern)
 Fahd wheeled armoured personnel carrier (Egypt; Cold War)
 KAFIV 30 infantry fighting vehicle based on the K200 (South Korea; Modern)
 KAFIV 90 infantry fighting vehicle based on the K200 (South Korea; Modern)
 KAM-1 armoured recovery vehicle based on the T-54 chassis (Finland; Cold War)
 KAM-2 armoured recovery vehicle based on the T-55 chassis (Finland; Cold War)
 Kangaroo armoured personnel carrier (Canada; World War II)
 Ke-Go (army name for the Type 95 Ha-Go)
 Kentauras infantry fighting vehicle (Greece; modern)
 KIFV infantry fighting vehicle
 kleiner Panzerbefehlwagen I (designation for command variant of the Panzer I)
 Kliment Voroshilov series of heavy tanks (Soviet Union; World War II)
 Korean Infantry Fighting Vehicle (South Korea; Cold War)
 KrAZ series of cargo, special purpose and armoured personnel vehicles (Ukraine; Modern)
 Kubuś Armored Car (Poland; World War II)
 Kübelwagen (popular name for the Type 82, 86, 87, 92, 820, 821, 822, 823, 825, 826 and 827
 Kurierwagen (popular name for the Type 181, also known as the Type 182, Thing, Safari and Trekker)
 Kürassier (popular name for the SK-105 Kürassier, an Austrian light tank)

L 
 L3/35 light tank based on the CV-33 (also known as the Carro Veloce CV-35) (Italy; pre–World War II)
 L6/40 light tank (also known as the Carro Armato) (Italy; World War II)
 L-33 self-propelled 155mm gun based on a M4 Sherman chassis  (Israel; Cold War)
 Land Rover Wolf (Main utility vehicle of the British Army)
 Landwirtschäftlicher Schlepper (cover name for the Panzer I)
 LAV-25 8×8 armoured personnel carrier based on the Mowag Piranha (Canada; Cold War / modern)
 LAV III 8×8 armoured personnel carrier (Canada; Cold War / modern)
 LAV-300 6×6 armoured vehicle (also known as the V-300 Commando (United States; Cold War)
 LAV-600 6×6 fire support vehicle (also known as the V-600 Commando (United States; Cold War)
 Lazar BVT-SR-8808-MRAP 8×8 armoured personnel carrier (Serbia; modern)
 Leclerc main battle tank (France; modern)
 Leonidas-2 armoured personnel carrier based on the 4K 7FA (Greece; Modern)
 Leopard 1 main battle tank (Germany; Cold War)
 Leopard 2 main battle tank (Germany; Cold War/Modern)
 Leopard security vehicle - improvised protected personnel carrier; Rhodesian Bush War
 Liberty - popular name for US version of the Mark VIII
 Light Tank Mark VI (United Kingdom; World War II)
 Lince 4×4 armoured car based on the Daimler Dingo  (Italy; World War II)
 Lion of Babylon tank (Iraq; modern)
 LMV Lince 4×4 utility vehicle (also known as the Panther CLV) (Italy; Modern)
 Locust (popular name for the M22)
 Logistic Vehicle System (project name for the Mk 48 LVS family)
 LOV-ABK 4×4 NBC reconnaissance vehicle (Croatia; Modern)
 LOV-ED 4×4 electronic warfare vehicle (Croatia; Modern)
 LOV-IZV 4×4 reconnaissance vehicle (Croatia; Modern)
 LOV-OP 4×4 armoured personnel carrier (Croatia; Modern)
 LOV-RAK 4×4 self-propelled multiple rocket launcher (Croatia; Modern)
 LOV-UP 4×4 artillery fire control vehicle (Croatia; Modern)
 LOV-Z 4×4 command vehicle (Croatia; Modern)
 LSVW 4×4 utility vehicle based on the 40.10WM  (Italy and United States; Modern)
 LT-105 light tank based on the ASCOD (Austria and Spain; Modern)
 LT vz. 35 (Original Czechoslovak designation for the Panzer 35(t))
 LT vz. 38 (Original Czechoslovak designation for the Panzer 38(t))
 Luchs (popular name for the Spahpanzer Luchs)
 LVT-1 amphibious vehicle (United States; World War II)
 LVT-2 Water Buffalo amphibious vehicle (also known as Buffalo II) (United States; World War II)
 LVT-3 Bushmaster amphibious vehicle (United States; World War II)
 LVT-4 Water Buffalo amphibious vehicle (also known as Buffalo IV or Sea Serpent) (United States; World War II)
 LVT-5 amphibious vehicle series (United States; Cold War)
 LVTAA-1 amphibious vehicle with a M42 Duster turret (twin 40mm anti-aircraft guns) (United States; Cold War)
 LVTC-5 amphibious command vehicle (United States; Cold War)
 LVTE-5 amphibious mine clearing vehicle (United States; Cold War)
 LVTH-5 amphibious self-propelled 105mm howitzer (United States; Cold War)
 LVTP-5 amphibious armoured personnel carrier (United States; Cold War)
 LVTR-5 amphibious recovery vehicle (United States; Cold War)
 LVT-7 (former designation for the AAV-7)
 LVTC-7 (former designation for the AAVC-7)
 LVTP-7 (former designation for the AAVP-7)
 LVTR-7 (former designation for the AAVR-7)
 Lynx 4×4 armoured car based on the Daimler Dingo  (Canada; World War II)
 Lynx (popular name for the M113 Command and Reconnaissance vehicle (United States; Cold War)

M 
 M1 Abrams main battle tank (United States; Cold War/Modern)
 M1 Isherman medium tank based on the M4 Sherman (Israel; Cold War)
 M1 light tank (United States; pre–World War II)
 M1 6×4 ar; pre–World War II)
 M1 4×2 armoured vehicle (United States; pre–World War II)
 M1 4×4 1.5 ton truck with earth auger based on the Chevrolet G-7100 (United States; pre–World War II)
 M2 light tank (United States; pre–World War II)
 M2 Bradley infantry fighting vehicle (United States; Cold War/Modern)
 M2 4×4 armoured car (United States; pre–World War II)
 M2 half-track armoured personnel carrier (United States; World War II)
 M3 Lee medium tank (United States; World War II)
 M3 Isherman medium tank based on the M4 Sherman (Israel; Cold War)
 M3 Stuart light tank (United States; World War II)
 M3 Bradley armoured reconnaissance vehicle (United States; Cold War/Modern)
 M3 4×4 armoured car (United States; pre–World War II)
 M3 half-track armoured personnel carrier (United States; World War II)
 M3 4×4 armoured personnel carrier based on the Panhard AML (France; Cold War)
 M4 Sherman medium tank (United States; World War II)
 M4 4×4 armoured car (United States; pre–World War II)
 M4 mortar halftrack carrier (United States; World War II)
 M4 armoured command and control vehicle based on the MLRS chassis (United States; Modern)
 M4 Tractor (United States; World War II)
 M5 Stuart light tank (United States; World War II)
 M5 half-track armoured personnel carrier (United States; World War II)
 M5 Tractor (United States; World War II)
 M6 Linebacker self-propelled anti-aircraft vehicle with FIM-92 Stinger missiles based on the M2 Bradley (United States; Modern)
 M-5H-6 6×6 2.5 ton truck (also known as the G-651) (United States; World War II)
 M5 Bulldozer mounted on M8 chassis (United States; Cold War)
 M6 Bomb Service Truck 4×4 1.5 ton bomb disposal truck based on the Chevrolet G-7100 (United States; pre–World War II)
 M6 Tractor (United States)
 M6 Bulldozer mounted on the M47 Patton chassis (United States; Cold War)
 M7 Bradley fire support vehicle (United States; Modern)
 M7 Priest self-propelled 105mm howitzer (United States; World War II)
 M7 Snow Tractor (United States; World War II)
 M8 Greyhound 6×6 armoured car (United States; World War II)
 M8 Armored Gun System 105mm armoured gun system (United States; modern)
 M8 Scott self-propelled 75mm howitzer (United States; World War II)
 M8 Tractor based on the M48 (United States; Cold War)
 M8 Bulldozer based on the M8 Tractor (United States; Cold War)
 M9 ACE combat engineer vehicle (United States; modern)
 M9 Bulldozer mounted on the M60 chassis (United States; Cold War)
 M10 tank destroyer based on the M4 Sherman chassis (United States; World War II)
 M11/39 light tank (Italy; World War II)
 M11 4×4 armoured personnel vehicle based on the VBL  (France; Cold War)
 M12 Gun Motor Carriage self-propelled 155mm howitzer on M3 Grant chassis (United States; World War II)
 M13 Multiple Gun Motor Carriage anti-aircraft vehicle (United States; World War II)
 M13/40 light tank (Italy; World War II)
 M14/41 light tank (Italy; World War II)
 M15 CMGC anti-aircraft vehicle (United States; World War II)
 M15/42 medium tank (Italy; World War II)
 M16 MGMC anti-aircraft vehicle (United States; World War II)
 M18 Hellcat self-propelled 76mm anti-tank gun (United States; World War II)
 M19 self-propelled twin 40mm gun mounted on the M24 Chaffee chassis (United States; World War II/Cold War)
 M20 6×6 armoured utility vehicle based on the M8 Greyhound chassis (United States; World War II)
 M21 halftrack self-propelled 81mm mortar carrier (United States; World War II)
 M22 Locust airmobile light tank (United States; World War II)
 M24 Chaffee light tank (United States; World War II)
 M26 Pershing tank (United States; World War II/Korean War)
 M26 Tractor, component of the M25 tank transporter/recovery vehicle nicknamed "Dragon Wagon" (United States; World War II/Cold War)
 M29 Weasel cargo carrier (United States; World War II)
 M31 Honest John rocket carrier (United States; Cold War)
 M32 ARV armoured recovery vehicle (United States; World War II)
 M34 6×6 2.5 ton truck (United States; Cold War)
 M35 6×6 2.5 ton truck (United States; Cold War)
 M36 Jackson self-propelled 90mm anti-tank gun (United States; World War II/Cold War)
 M36 Nike-Hercules Missile Launcher-loader (United States; Cold War)
 M36 6×6 2.5 ton truck (United States; Cold War)
 M37 light utility vehicle (United States; Cold War)
 M38 Wolfhound 6×6 armoured car (United States; World War II)
 M38 Willys Jeep 4×4 utility vehicle (United States; Cold War)
 M39 6×6 5 ton truck (United States; Cold War)
 M39 armoured utility vehicle converted M18 Hellcat (United States)
 M40 GMC self-propelled gun (United States; World War II)
 M40 6×6 5 ton truck (United States; Cold War)
 M41 Walker Bulldog light tank (United States; Cold War)
 M41 Self-propelled M114 155 mm howitzer based on the M24 Chaffee chassis (United States; Cold War)
 M41 6×6 5 ton truck (United States; Cold War)
 M42 Duster self-propelled twin 40mm anti-aircraft guns (United States; Cold War)
 M/42 4×4 armoured personnel carrier (also known as KP) (Sweden; World War II)
 M42 4×4 command vehicle (United States; Cold War)
 M43 4×4 ambulance (United States; Cold War)
 M44 self-propelled 155mm howitzer on the M41 Walker Bulldog chassis (United States; Cold War)
 M44 6×6 2.5 ton truck (United States; Cold War)
 M45 armoured serving and refuelling vehicle based on the M548 (United States; Cold War)
 M45 6×6 2.5 ton truck (United States; Cold War)
 M46 Patton medium Tank (United States; Korean War/Cold War)
 M46 6×6 2.5 ton truck (United States; Cold War)
 M47 Patton medium tank (United States; Cold War)
 M47 6×6 dump truck (United States; Cold War)
 M48 Patton medium tank (United States; Vietnam War/Cold War)
 M48 Chaparral tracked surface-to-air missile carrier (United States; Cold War)
 M48 6×6 truck tractor (United States; Cold War)
 M49 Otter amphibious cargo/troop carrier (United States; Cold War)
 M49 6×6 fuel tanker (United States; Cold War)
 M50 Super Sherman medium tank based on the M4 Sherman (Israel; Cold War)
 M50 Honest John rocket launcher (United States; Cold War)
 M50 Ontos Self-propelled 106mm Recoilless Rifle
 M50 6×6 water tanker (United States; Cold War)
 M51 Super Sherman medium tank based on the M4 Sherman (Israel; Cold War)
 M51 Recovery vehicle (United States; Cold War)
 M51 6×6 dump truck (United States; Cold War)
 M52 self-propelled 105mm Howitzer on a M41 chassis (United States; Cold War)
 M52 6×6 tractor (United States; Cold War)
 M53 Long Tom self-propelled 155mm howitzer (United States; Cold War)
 M-53 6×6 self-propelled twin 30mm anti-aircraft guns based on a V3 Praga (Czechoslovakia; Cold War)
 M54 Self-propelled 105mm field gun (United States; Cold War)
 M54 6×6 5 ton truck (United States; Cold War)
 M-55 main battle tank based on the T-55 (Slovenia; Cold War)
 M55 6×6 5 ton truck (United States; Cold War)
 M56 Scorpion anti-tank vehicle carrying either a 90mm anti-tank gun or a 106mm recoilless rifle (United States; Cold War)
 M56 4×4 utility vehicle (United States; Cold War)
 M57 6×6 2.5 ton Truck (United States; Cold War)
 M58 smoke generator vehicle based on the M113  (United States; Cold War)
 M59 armoured personnel carrier (United States; Cold War)
 M59 6×6 dump truck (United States; Cold War)
 M59 4×4 utility vehicle (Romania; Cold War)
 M60 Patton main battle tank (United States; Cold War)
 M-60 armoured personnel carrier (previously known as the M-590) (Yugoslavia; Cold War)
 M60 6×6 wrecker/tow truck (United States; Cold War)
 M61 6×6 5 ton truck (United States; Cold War)
 M62 6×6 wrecker/tow truck (United States; Cold War)
 M63 6×6 5 ton truck (United States; Cold War)
 M64 6×6 5 ton truck (United States; Cold War)
 M66 Medium Tank (United States; Cold War)
 M67 Medium flamethrower Tank based on the M48 chassis
 M70 Main Battle tank (United States/Germany; Cold War/modern)
 M74 armoured recovery vehicle based on the M4 chassis (United States; Cold War)
 M75 armoured personnel carrier (United States; Cold War)
 M76 Otter amphibious cargo carrier (United States; Cold War)
 M-77 main battle tank based on the T-55 (Romania; Cold War)
 M-80 infantry fighting vehicle based on the BMP-1  (previous known as the M-980) (Yugoslavia; Cold War)
 M-84 main battle tank based on the T-72 (Yugoslavia; Cold War/Modern)
 M84 self-propelled 105mm mortar (United States; Cold War)
 M85 wheeled truck tractor (United States; Cold War)
 M88 armoured recovery vehicle (United States; Cold War)
 M91 self-propelled multiple rocket launcher on a 6×6 2.5 ton Truck (United States; Cold War)
 M-94 Plamen-S self-propelled multiple rocket launcher on a 6×6 truck (Yugoslavia)
 M95 Degman main battle tank (Croatia; modern)
 M93 Fox 6×6 armoured reconnaissance vehicle (Germany; Cold War)
 M102 armoured engineering vehicle based on a M47 chassis (United States; Cold War)
 M103 heavy tank (United States; Cold War)
 M104 self-propelled 105mm howitzer (United States; Cold War)
 M106 self-propelled 107mm mortar in a M113 vehicle (United States; Cold War)
 M107 self-propelled 175mm gun (United States; Cold War)
 M108 self-propelled 105mm howitzer (United States; Cold War)
 M108 6×6 2.5 ton radio repair truck (United States; Cold War)
 M108 6×6 wrecker/tow truck (United States; Cold War)
 M109 self-propelled 155mm howitzer (United States; Cold War)
 M109 6×6 2.5 ton Truck (United States; Cold War)
 M110 self-propelled 203mm howitzer (United States; Cold War)
 M113 armoured personnel carrier (United States; Cold War)
 M114 command and reconnaissance vehicle (United States; Cold War)
 M116 amphibious personnel carrier (United States; Cold War)
 M123 6×6 truck tractor (United States; Cold War)
 M124 6×6 2.5 ton radio repair truck (United States; Cold War)
 M125 6×6 10 ton truck (United States; Cold War)
 M125 self-propelled 81mm mortar (United States; Cold War)
 M132 armoured flamethrower based on the M113 (United States; Cold War)
 M132 6×6 medical vehicle (United States; Cold War)
 M133 6×6 canteen vehicle (Canada; Cold War)
 M135 6×6 2.5 ton truck (United States; Cold War)
 M139 6×6 transporter for the Honest John rocket (United States; Cold War)
 M139 6×6 bridge layer (United States; Cold War)
 M147 amphibious 5 ton truck (United States; Cold War)
 M151 4×4 utility vehicle (United States; Vietnam)
 M152 4×4 radio and command utility vehicle (Canada; Cold War)
 M162 Vulcan Air Defence System based on the M732 (United States; Cold War)
 M163 VADS Vulcan Air Defence System based on the M732 (United States; Cold War)
 M170 4×4 utility vehicle (United States; Cold War)
 M185 6×6 repair vehicle (United States; Cold War)
 M195 self-propelled 105mm howitzer (United States; Cold War)
 M201 4×4 utility vehicle (United States; Cold War)
 M211 6×6 2.5 ton truck (United States; Cold War)
 M215 6×6 dump truck (United States; Cold War)
 M216 6×6 fuel tanker (United States; Cold War)
 M217 6×6 fuel tanker (United States; Cold War)
 M220 6×6 2.5 ton truck (United States; Cold War)
 M221 6×6 truck tractor (United States; Cold War)
 M222 6×6 water tanker (United States; Cold War)
 M-240 Storm 4×4 utility vehicle based on the Jeep Wrangler YJ (Israel; Cold War/Modern)
 M-242 Storm Mark II/III 4×4 utility vehicle based on the Jeep Wrangler TJ (Israel; Modern)
 M246 6×6 wrecker/tow truck (United States; Cold War)
 M249 heavy transporter (United States; Cold War)
 M250 heavy transporter (United States; Cold War)
 M268 6×6 propellant tanker (United States; Cold War)
 M270 self-propelled multiple rocket launcher (France, Germany, United Kingdom and United States; Cold War/Modern)
 M274 Mule 4×4 utility vehicle (United States; Cold War)
 M275 6×6 truck tractor (United States; Cold War)
 M283 4×4 utility vehicle (United States; Cold War)
 M289 wheeled missile launcher truck (United States; Cold War)
 M291 6×6 5 ton truck (United States; Cold War)
 M292 6×6 2.5 ton truck (United States; Cold War)
 M328 6×6 bridge layer (United States; Cold War)
 M342 6×6 dump truck (United States; Cold War)
 M348 6×6 dump truck (United States; Cold War)
 M382 6×6 bridging layer (United States; Cold War)
 M386 6×6 rocket launcher with single Honest John rocket (United States; Cold War)
 M422 Mighty Mite 4×4 utility vehicle (United States; Vietnam)
 M462 4×4 utility vehicle (also known as the Abir and Rhino) (Israel; Cold War/Modern)
 M474 self-propelled medium range ballistic missile launcher with a MGM-31 Pershing missile based on a M113   (United States; Cold War)
 M501 MIM-23 Hawk transporter and loader (United States; Cold War)
 M512 6×6 2.5 ton truck (United States; Cold War)
 M520 Goer 4×4 8 ton articulated truck (United States; Cold War)
 M521 Self-propelled 105mm howitzer (United States; Cold War)
 M523 wheeled truck tractor (United States; Cold War)
 M543 6×6 wrecker/tow truck (United States; Cold War)
 M546 self-propelled surface-to-air missile vehicle with MIM-46 missiles based on a M113   (United States; Cold War)
 M548 cargo vehicle based on a M113   (United States; Cold War)
 M551 Sheridan Armored Airborne Reconnaissance Assault Vehicle (United States; Vietnam War/ Cold War)
 M553 Goer 4×4 articulated wrecker recovery vehicle (United States; Cold War)
 M559 4×4 articulated fuel tanker based on the M520 Goer (United States; Cold War)
 M561 Gama Goat 6×6 articulated truck (United States; Cold War)
 M577 command vehicle based on the M113   (United States; Cold War/Modern)
 M578 light armoured recovery vehicle (United States; Cold War)
 M579 repair vehicle based on the M113   (United States; Cold War)
 M-590 (previous designation of the M-60)
 M601 4×4 power generator carrier (United States; Cold War)
 M602 6×6 2.5 ton truck (United States; Cold War)
 M606 Willys Jeep 4×4 utility vehicle (United States; Cold War)
 M615 4×4 wheeled ambulance (United States; Cold War)
 M621 6×6 2.5 ton Truck (United States; Cold War)
 M622 6×6 fuel tanker (United States; Cold War)
 M623 6×6 2.5 ton truck (United States; Cold War)
 M624 6×6 dump truck (United States; Cold War)
 M656 8×8 5 ton air-transportable and floatable truck (United States; Cold War)
 M667 self-propelled missile launcher carrying the MGM-52 Lance surface-to-surface missile   (United States; Cold War)
 M688 supply vehicle for the MGM-52 Lance surface-to-surface missile based on the M113   (United States; Cold War)
 M696 recovery vehicle based on the M548   (United States; Cold War)
 M706 4×4 armoured vehicle (also known as the V-100 Commando (United States; Cold War)
 M715 Jeep 4×4 utility vehicle (United States; Cold War)
 M718 4×4 ambulance based on the M151 jeep (United States; Cold War)
 M724 Jeep 4×4 utility vehicle (United States; Cold War)
 M725 Jeep 4×4 ambulance (United States; Cold War)
 M726 Jeep 4×4 maintenance vehicle (United States; Cold War)
 M727 self-propelled surface-to-air missile launcher with MIM-23 Hawk missiles based on the M113   (United States; Cold War)
 M728 CEV combat engineer vehicle (United States; Cold War/modern)
 M730 carrier for the M48 Chaparral launcher based on the M113   (United States; Cold War)
 M732 self-propelled M162 Vulcan Air Defence System based on the M113 (United States; Cold War)
 M734 infantry fighting vehicle based on the M113   (United States; Cold War)
 M741 self-propelled M163 Vulcan Air Defence System based on the M113 (United States; Cold War)
 M748 6×6 5 ton truck (United States; Cold War)
 M751 6×6 2.5 ton truck (United States; Cold War)
 M752 self-propelled MGM-52 Lance surface-to-surface missile launcher based on the M113   (United States; Cold War)
 M756 6×6 pipeline maintenance vehicle (United States; Cold War)
 M757 8×8 truck tractor (United States; Cold War)
 M763 6×6 telephone maintenance vehicle (United States; Cold War)
 M764 6×6 earth boring maintenance vehicle (United States; Cold War)
 M791 8×8 5 ton truck (United States; Cold War)
 M792 4×4 articulated ambulance based on the M520 Goer (United States; Cold War)
 M806 armoured recovery vehicle based on the M113   (United States; Cold War)
 M809 6×6 5 ton truck (United States; Cold War)
 M810 6×6 5 ton truck (United States; Cold War)
 M811 6×6 5 ton truck (United States; Cold War)
 M812 6×6 5 ton truck (United States; Cold War)
 M813 6×6 5 ton truck (United States; Cold War)
 M814 6×6 5 ton truck (United States; Cold War)
 M815 6×6 5 ton truck (United States; Cold War)
 M816 wrecker/tow truck (United States; Cold War)
 M817 6×6 dump truck (United States; Cold War)
 M818 6×6 truck tractor (United States; Cold War)
 M819 6×6 wrecker/tow truck (United States; Cold War)
 M820 6×6 5 ton truck (United States; Cold War)
 M821 6×6 bridge transporter (United States; Cold War)
 M825 4×4 self-propelled recoilless rifle based on the M151 (United States; Cold War)
 M877 Goer 4×4 articulated truck (United States; Cold War)
 M880 4×4 utility vehicle based on the Dodge pickup truck (United States; Cold War)
 M881 4×4 utility vehicle based on the Dodge pickup truck (United States; Cold War)
 M882 4×4 utility vehicle based on the Dodge pickup truck (United States; Cold War)
 M883 4×4 utility vehicle based on the Dodge pickup truck (United States; Cold War)
 M884 4×4 utility vehicle based on the Dodge pickup truck (United States; Cold War)
 M885 4×4 utility vehicle based on the Dodge pickup truck (United States; Cold War)
 M886 4×4 Ambulance based on the Dodge pickup truck (United States; Cold War)
 M887 4×4 Maintenance vehicle based on the Dodge pickup truck (United States; Cold War)
 M888 4×4 Telephone Maintenance vehicle based on the Dodge pickup truck (United States; Cold War)
 M890 4×2 utility vehicle based on the Dodge pickup truck (United States; Cold War)
 M891 4×2 utility vehicle based on the Dodge pickup truck (United States; Cold War)
 M892 4×2 utility vehicle based on the Dodge pickup truck (United States; Cold War)
 M893 4×2 ambulance based on the Dodge pickup truck (United States; Cold War)
 M901 ITV self-propelled TOW missile launcher based on the M113   (United States; Cold War)
 M915 6×4 truck tractor, line haul (United States; Cold War)
 M916 6×6 truck tractor, w/winch (United States; Cold War)
 M917 8×6 truck chassis, for 20-ton dump truck (United States; Cold War)
 M918 6×6 truck chassis, for 1,500 gallon bituminous distributor (United States; Cold War)
 M919 8×6 truck chassis, for concrete mobile mixer (United States; Cold War)
 M920 8×6 truck tractor, MET, w/winch (United States; Cold War)
 M923 6×6 5 ton truck (United States; Cold War/modern)
 M924 6×6 5 ton truck (United States; Cold War/modern)
 M925 6×6 5 ton truck (United States; Cold War/modern)
 M926 6×6 5 ton truck (United States; Cold War/modern)
 M927 6×6 5 ton truck (United States; Cold War/modern)
 M928 6×6 5 ton truck (United States; Cold War/modern)
 M929 6×6 dump truck (United States; Cold War/modern)
 M930 6×6 dump truck (United States; Cold War/modern)
 M931 6×6 truck tractor (United States; Cold War/modern)
 M932 6×6 truck tractor (United States; Cold War/modern)
 M933 6×6 truck tractor (United States; Cold War/modern)
 M934 6×6 5 ton truck (United States; Cold War/modern)
 M935 6×6 5 ton truck (United States; Cold War/modern)
 M936 6×6 wrecker/tow truck (United States; Cold War/modern)
 M939 6×6 5 ton truck (United States; Cold War/modern)
 M940 6×6 5 ton truck (United States; Cold War/modern)
 M941 6×6 5 ton truck (United States; Cold War/modern)
 M944 6×6 5 ton truck (United States; Cold War/modern)
 M945 6×6 5 ton truck (United States; Cold War/modern)
 M966 4×4 self-propelled TOW missile launcher based on the HMMWV (United States; Cold War/Modern)
 M973 4×4 self-propelled Stinger surface-to-air missile launcher based on the HMMWV (United States; Cold War/Modern)
 M977 HEMTT 8×8 10 ton heavy truck (United States; modern)
 M978 HEMTT 8×8 fuel tanker (United States; modern)
 M-980 (previous designation of the M-80)
 M981 FISTV self-propelled TOW missile launcher based on the M113   (United States; Cold War/modern)
 M983 HEMAT 8×8 tractor-trailer ammunition vehicle (United States; modern)
 M984 HEMTT 8×8 10 ton wrecker recovery vehicle (United States; modern)
 M985 HEMTT 8×8 10 ton truck with crane (United States; modern)
 M992 FAASV ammunition vehicle (United States; Cold War/modern)
 M993 self-propelled multiple rocket launcher (France, Germany, United Kingdom and United States; Modern)
 M996 4×4 ambulance based on the HMMWV (United States; Cold War/Modern)
 M997 4×4 ambulance based on the HMMWV (United States; Cold War/Modern)
 M998 HMMWV 4×4 utility vehicle (United States; Cold War/Modern)
 M1001 8×8 truck tractor  (United States; Cold War/modern)
 M1002 8×8 wrecker recovery Truck (United States; Cold War/modern)
 M1008 4×4 utility vehicle based on the General Motors Model K30903 (United States; Cold War/modern)
 M1009 4×4 utility vehicle based on the Chevrolet K5 Blazer (United States; Cold War/modern)
 M1010 4×4 ambulance based on the M1008 (United States; Cold War/modern)
 M1015 electronic warfare systems carrier based on the M113   (United States; Cold War/modern)
 M1025 HMMWV 4×4 weapon carrier (United States; Cold War/Modern)
 M1026 HMMWV 4×4 weapon carrier (United States; Cold War/Modern)
 M1028 HMMWV 4×4 electronic systems carrier (United States; Cold War/Modern)
 M1031 4×4 utility vehicle based on the M1008 (United States; Cold War/modern)
 M1035 HMMWV 4×4 ambulance (United States; Cold War/Modern)
 M1036 4×4 self-propelled TOW missile launcher based on the HMMWV  (United States; Cold War/Modern)
 M1037 HMMWV 4×4 shelter carrier (United States; Cold War/Modern)
 M1038 HMMWV 4×4 utility vehicle (United States; Cold War/Modern)
 M1042 HMMWV 4×4 shelter carrier (United States; Cold War/Modern)
 M1043 HMMWV 4×4 weapon carrier (United States; Cold War/Modern)
 M1044 HMMWV 4×4 weapon carrier (United States; Cold War/Modern)
 M1045 4×4 self-propelled TOW missile launcher based on the HMMWV  (United States; Cold War/Modern)
 M1046 4×4 self-propelled TOW missile launcher based on the HMMWV  (United States; Cold War/Modern)
 M1059 smoke generator vehicle based on the M113   (United States; Cold War/modern)
 M1064 self-propelled 120mm mortar based on the M113   (United States; Cold War/Modern)
 M1068 command vehicle based on the M113   (United States; Cold War/Modern)
 M1069 HMMWV 4×4 light artillery mover (United States; Cold War/Modern)
 M1070 Bradley electronic warfare systems carrier (United States; modern)
 M1070 Heavy Equipment Transporter, truck tractor (United States; Modern)
 M1078 FMTV truck series (United States; modern)
 M1097 HMMWV 4×4 utility vehicle (United States; Cold War/Modern)
 M1097 Avenger, self-propelled air-defence vehicle with FIM-92 Stinger missiles on the HMMWV chassis (United States; Modern)
 M1108 armoured carrier based on the M113   (United States; Cold War/modern)
 M1109 HMMWV 4×4 weapon carrier (United States; Modern)
 M1113 HMMWV 4×4 utility vehicle (United States; Modern)
 M1114 HMMWV 4×4 weapon carrier with improved armour protection (United States; Modern)
 M1115 HMMWV 4×4 self-propelled TOW missile launcher based on the HMMWV  (United States; Modern)
 M1116 4×4 armoured security vehicle based on the HMMWV  (United States; Modern)
 M117 Guardian 4×4 armoured security vehicle based on the V-100 Commando (United States; Modern)
 M1120 8×8 load handling system based on the HEMTT (United States; modern)
 M1121 HMMWV 4×4 self-propelled TOW missile launcher based on the HMMWV  (United States; Modern)
 M1123 HMMWV 4×4 utility vehicle (United States; Modern)
 M1124 HMMWV 4×4 utility vehicle (United States; Modern)
 M1151 HMMWV 4×4 weapon carrier (United States; Modern)
 M1152 HMMWV 4×4 utility vehicle (United States; Modern)
 M1917 (American service designation for the Renault FT-17)
 M1919 light tank (United States; pre–World War II)
 M1921 medium tank prototype (also known as Medium A) (United States; pre–World War II)
 M1921 light tank (United States; pre–World War II)
 M1922 medium tank prototype (also known as Medium A) (United States; pre–World War II)
 M1923 medium tank prototype (also known as Medium A) (United States; pre–World War II)
 M1924 medium tank prototype (also known as Medium A) (United States; pre–World War II)
 M1928 light tank (United States; pre–World War II)
 M1931 light tank (United States; pre–World War II)
 M1932 light tank (United States; pre–World War II)
 M1932 4×2 armoured 5 ton truck based on the Standard B Liberty truck (United States; pre–World War II)
 M1933 airborne armoured vehicle (United States; pre–World War II)
 M1937 light tank (United States; pre–World War II)
 M1945 NATO reporting name for the T-34 medium tank (Soviet Union; World War II)
 M1946 NATO reporting name for the T-54 main battle tank (Soviet Union; Cold War)
 M1947 NATO reporting name for the T-34 medium tank (Poland; Cold War)
 M1949 NATO reporting name for the T-54 main battle tank (Soviet Union; Cold War)
 M1951 NATO reporting name for the T-54 main battle tank (Soviet Union; Cold War)
 M1953 NATO reporting name for the T-54 main battle tank (Soviet Union; Cold War)
 M1956 NATO reporting name for the BTR-40 4×4 armoured personnel carrier (Soviet Union; Cold War)
 M1957 NATO reporting name for the BTR-40 4×4 armoured personnel carrier (Soviet Union; Cold War)
 M1958 NATO reporting name for the BRDM-1 4×4 reconnaissance vehicle (Soviet Union; Cold War)
 M1959 NATO reporting name for the BRDM-1 4×4 reconnaissance vehicle (Soviet Union; Cold War)
 M1960 NATO reporting name for the BRDM-1 4×4 reconnaissance vehicle (Soviet Union; Cold War)
 M1964 NATO reporting name for the ZSU-23-4 self-propelled anti-aircraft 23mm guns (Soviet Union; Cold War)
 M1965 NATO reporting name for the ZSU-23-4 self-propelled anti-aircraft 23mm guns (Soviet Union; Cold War)
 M1968 NATO reporting name for the ZSU-23-4 self-propelled anti-aircraft 23mm guns (Soviet Union; Cold War)
 M1970 NATO reporting name for the T-55 main battle tank (Soviet Union; Cold War)
 M1970 NATO reporting name for the T-34 medium tank (Poland; Cold War)
 M1971 NATO reporting name for the 2S1 Gvozdika self-propelled 122mm howitzer (Soviet Union; Cold War)
 M1972 NATO reporting name for the ZSU-23-4 self-propelled anti-aircraft 23mm guns (Soviet Union; Cold War)
 M1973 NATO reporting name for the 2S3 Akatsiya self-propelled 152mm howitzer (Soviet Union; Cold War)
 M1974 NATO reporting name for the 2S1 Gvozdika self-propelled 122mm howitzer (Soviet Union; Cold War)
 M1975 8×8 heavy dry support bridge launcher based on the HEMTT (United States; modern)
 M1975 NATO reporting name for the 2S7 Pion self-propelled 203mm howitzer (Soviet Union; Cold War)
 M1975 NATO reporting name for the 2S4 Tyulpan self-propelled 240mm mortar (Soviet Union; Cold War)
 M1975/4 NATO reporting name for the BTR-40 4×4 armoured personnel carrier (Cuba; Cold War)
 M1977 NATO reporting name for the ZSU-23-4 self-propelled anti-aircraft 23mm guns (Soviet Union; Cold War)
 M1977 8×8 common bridge transporter based on the HEMTT (United States; modern)
 M1978 NATO reporting name for the T-64 main battle tank (Soviet Union; Cold War)
 M1979 NATO reporting name for the MTK-2 mine clearing vehicle (Soviet Union; Cold War)
 M1978 NATO reporting name for the BTR-70 8×8 armoured personnel carrier (Soviet Union; Cold War)
 M1981 NATO reporting name for the 2S5 Giatsint-S self-propelled 152mm gun (Soviet Union; Cold War)
 M1980/1 NATO reporting name for the T-72 main battle tank (Soviet Union; Cold War)
 M1980/2 NATO reporting name for the T-64 main battle tank (Soviet Union; Cold War)
 M1981/3 NATO reporting name for the T-72 main battle tank (Soviet Union; Cold War)
 M1984 NATO reporting name for the T-72 main battle tank (Soviet Union; Cold War)
 M1984 NATO reporting name for the Type 59 main battle tank (China; Cold War/Modern)
 M1984 NATO reporting name for the BTR-70 8×8 armoured personnel carrier (Soviet Union; Cold War)
  M1984 NATO reporting name for the WZ523 6×6 armoured personnel carrier   (China; Cold War/Modern)
 M1985 NATO reporting name for the Type 55 main battle tank (Soviet Union; Cold War)
 M1985 NATO reporting name for a light tank based on the VTT-323 (China; Cold War/Modern)
 M1985 NATO reporting name for the ZSU-23-4 self-propelled anti-aircraft 23mm guns (Soviet Union; Cold War)
 M1986 NATO reporting name for the T-72 main battle tank (Soviet Union; Cold War)
 M1986 NATO reporting name for the T-55 main battle tank (Soviet Union; Cold War)
 M1986 NATO reporting name for the BTR-70 8×8 armoured personnel carrier (Soviet Union; Cold War/Modern)
 M1986 NATO reporting name for the Tunguska-M1 self-propelled twin 30mm anti-aircraft guns and missiles (Soviet Union; Cold War/Modern)
 M1988 NATO reporting name for the T-72 main battle tank (Soviet Union; Cold War)
 M1990 NATO reporting name for the T-72 main battle tank (Soviet Union; Cold War)
 M-2001 Main Battle Tank (Serbia; Modern)
 MAC-1 4×4 armoured car (United States; Cold War)
 MAC-2 4×4 armoured car based on the MAC-1  (Spain; Cold War)
 Mae West (popular name for the M2 Light Tank)
 Magach main battle tank (Israel; Cold War)
 Majnoon self-propelled 155mm howitzer (Iraq; modern)
 Mamba mine proof wheeled armoured personnel carrier (South Africa; modern)
 MAR 240 self-propelled multiple rocket launcher based on a M4 Sherman chassis (Israel; Cold War)
 MAR 290 self-propelled multiple rocket launcher based on a M4 Sherman chassis (Israel; Cold War)
 Marauder (vehicle) armoured vehicle
 Marder II self-propelled 75mm antitank gun on a Panzer II chassis (Germany; World War II)
 Marder (IFV) infantry fighting vehicle (Germany; Cold War/modern)
 Mark I series of tanks (United Kingdom; World War I)
 Mark VIII Liberty (Anglo-American version of the Mark I (tank))
 Mark IX tank armoured personnel carrier (United Kingdom; World War I)
 Mark E light tank (also known as the Vickers 6 ton) (United Kingdom; pre–World War II)
 Matador armoured vehicle
 Maverick internal security vehicle
 MAZ-543 8×8 transport/launcher of the Scud short range ballistic missile (also known as the 9P117) (Soviet Union; Cold War)
 MB Willys Jeep 4×4 Utility Vehicle (related to Ford GPW)(United States and United Kingdom; World War II)
 MB-3 Tamoio main battle tank (Brazil; Cold War/Modern)
 Mbombe armoured vehicle
 MBP 8×8 armoured security vehicle based on the BTR-70 (Soviet Union; Cold War)
 MBT-70 prototype main battle tank (United States and Germany; Cold War, cancelled)
 MBT-80 prototype main battle tank (also known as the FV4601) (United Kingdom; Cold War)
 MBT-2000 main battle tank (also known as the Al-Khalid) (China and Pakistan; modern)
 MCV-80 (early designation for the FV510 Warrior)
 MDT David 4×4 armoured utility vehicle based on the Land Rover Defender (United States; modern)
 Medium A medium tank prototypes (also known as M1921, M1922, M1923 and M1924) (United States; pre–World War II)
 Medium Mark A (official designation for the Whippet Mk A)
 Medium Mark B medium tank (United Kingdom; World War I)
 Medium Mark C medium tank (United Kingdom; World War I)
 Merkava main battle tank (Israel; modern)
 MEX-1 4×4 armoured car based on the MAC-1 (United States; Cold War)
 Mk 48 LVS 10 ton truck (United States; modern)
 Mk 61 self-propelled 105mm gun (France; Cold War)
 Mk F3 self-propelled 155mm gun (France; Cold War)
 MLI-84 infantry fighting vehicle based on the BMP-1 (Soviet Union; Cold War) (Romania; Cold War / modern)
 MLRS (acronym for the M270 and M993 Multiple Launch Rocket System)
 MLVM armoured personnel carrier (Romania; Cold War)
 MLVW 6×6 2.5 ton truck series (Canada and United States; Modern)
 Mobile Gun System version of the Stryker AFV mounting a 105 mm tank gun
 Mowag Grenadier wheeled armoured personnel carrier (Switzerland; Cold War)
 Mowag Piranha wheeled armoured personnel carrier (Switzerland; Cold War/modern)
 Mowag Roland wheeled APC (Switzerland; Cold War)
 Mowag Shark wheeled combat vehicle (Switzerland; modern)
 Mowag SPY wheeled light reconnaissance vehicle (Switzerland; modern)
 Mowag Tornado infantry fighting vehicle (Switzerland; modern)
 MP-31armoured staff vehicle based on the BMP-1 (Soviet Union; Cold War)
 MPAEJ 8×8 combat engineering vehicle based on the BTR-80 (Hungary; Cold War)
 MPFJ 8×8 obstacle clearing vehicle based on the BTR-80 (Hungary; Cold War)
 MRAP Mine Resistant Ambush Protected
 MT-55 bridging vehicle (Czechoslovakia and Soviet Union; Cold War)
 MTK-2 mine clearing vehicle based on the 2S1 chassis (Soviet Union; Cold War)
 MT-LB armoured personnel carrier (Soviet Union; Cold War)
 MT-LBu armoured multi-purpose carrier (Soviet Union; Cold War)
 MTP-3 armoured recovery vehicle based on the IT-122 (Soviet Union; Cold War)
 MTU-20 bridging vehicle based on the T-55 (Soviet Union; Cold War)
 MTU-72 bridge layer vehicle based on the T-72 (Soviet Union; Cold War)
 MTVC cargo carrier based on the MTVL   (United States; Modern)
 MTVF engineering vehicle based on the MTVL   (United States; Modern)
 MTVL armoured vehicle based on the M113   (United States; Modern)
 MTVR six-wheel drive all-terrain vehicle that replaced the M939   (United States; Modern)
 MU-90 mine layer vehicle based on the OT-90 (Czechoslovakia; Cold War)
 Mungo ESK wheeled armoured personnel carrier (Germany; modern)
 MVJ 8×8 armoured recovery vehicle based on the BTR-80 (Hungary; Cold War)

N 
 "Nahuel" D.L. 43 medium tank (Argentina; World War II)
 Nashorn (Hornisse) tank destroyer (Germany; World War II)
 NGV-1 6×6 infantry fighting vehicle based on the WZ551 (China; modern)
 NJ2045 4×4 utility vehicle (China; modern)
 NJ2046 4×4 utility vehicle based on the Iveco 40.19WM (China; modern)
 NM-142 infantry fighting vehicle based on the M113   (Norway; Cold War)
 NM-142 self-propelled anti-tank vehicle with TOW2 missiles based on the M113   (Norway; Cold War)
 NVH-1 infantry combat vehicle (China; modern)
 Nyala (popular name for the RG-31)
 NZLAV 8×8 infantry fighting vehicle based on the LAV III (Canada; Modern)

O 
 OF-40 main battle tank (Italy; Cold War)
 OF-120 main battle tank (Italy; modern)
 Ogum (popular name for the EE-T4 Ogum)
 Olifant Mk 1B main battle tank (South Africa; Cold War/modern)
 Orca (popular name for the VTP-1 Orca)
 Osorio (popular name for the EE-T1 Osório series)
 OT-54 flamethrower tank based on the T-54 (Soviet Union; Cold War)
 OT-55 flamethrower tank based on the T-55 (Soviet Union; Cold War)
 OT-62 armoured personnel carrier based on the BTR-50 (Czechoslovakia and Poland; Cold War)
 OT-64 SKOT armoured personnel carrier based on the BTR-60 (Czechoslovakia and Poland; Cold War)
 OT-65 4×4 reconnaissance vehicle (Czechoslovakia and Hungary; Cold War)
 OT-90 armoured personnel carrier based on the BMP-1 (Czechoslovakia; Cold War)

P 
 P4 4×4 utility vehicle based on the Mercedes-Benz G-Class (France; Cold War)
 P26/40 (alternate designation for the Carro Armato P 40)
 P40 medium tank (also known as the Carro Pesante P26/40) (Italy; World War II)
 P-90 (alternative designation for the Al-Khalid main battle tank) (Chaina and Pakistan; modern)
 P-240 8×8 switchboard vehicle based on the K1Sh1 (Soviet Union; Cold War)
 Paladin (popular name for later versions of the M109 howitzer)
 Pandur I 6x6 armoured vehicle (Austria; Cold War/Modern)
 Pandur II 8×8 armoured vehicle (Austria; Modern)
 Pangu (popular name for the XA-180 Pangu)
 Panther (popular name for the Panzer V)
 Panther CLV 4×4 utility vehicle (also known as the LMV Lince) (Italy and United Kingdom; Modern)
 Panzer I light tank (Germany; World War II)
 Panzer II light tank (Germany; World War II)
 Panzer III medium tank (Germany; World War II)
 Panzer IV medium tank (Germany; World War II)
 Panzer V Panther main battle tank (Germany; World War II)
 Panzer VI Tiger heavy tank (Germany; World War II)
 Panzer VIII Maus super-heavy tank (Germany; World War II)
 Panzer 35(t) light/medium tank (Czechoslovakia; World War II)
 Panzer 38(t) light/medium tank (Czechoslovakia; World War II)
 Patria AMV 8×8 or 6×6 multi-role military vehicle produced by the Finnish weapons manufacturer Patria
 Patton (popular name for the M46, M47, M48 and M60 Patton-series main battle tanks)
 Pbv 301 armoured personnel carrier (also known as the Pansarbandvagn 301) (Sweden; Cold War)
 Pbv 302 armoured personnel carrier (also known as the Pansarbandvagn 302) (Sweden; Cold War)
 Pbv 401 armoured personnel carrier based on the MT-LB (also known as the Pansarbandvagn 401) (Sweden; Cold War)
 Pegaso 3560 armoured personnel carrier (Spain; Cold War)
 Petit Véhicule Protégé full name for the PVP armoured utility vehicle (France; modern)
 Pilot Bantom 4×4 Utility Vehicle Prototype (United States; pre–World War II)
 Piranha (popular name for the MOWAG Piranha)
 Pizarro (popular name for the Spanish ASCOD infantry fighting vehicle) (Austria and Spain; Modern)
 Plasan Sand Cat light armoured vehicle (Israel; modern)
 PLZ-05 self-propelled 155mm howitzer (China; modern)
 PLZ-07 self-propelled 122mm howitzer (also known as the Type 07) (China; modern)
 PLZ-45 self-propelled 155mm howitzer (also known as the Type 88) (China; modern)
 PLZ-89 self-propelled 122mm howitzer (also known as the Type 89) (China; modern)
 PLL-05 self-propelled mortar (China; Modern)
 PGZ-09 self-propelled anti aircraft gun (China; Modern)
 PGZ-95 self-propelled anti aircraft gun (China; Modern)
 PHL-03 multiple rocket launcher (China; Modern)
 PL-01 light tank based on the Swedish CV90120-T (Poland; Modern)
 PMCz-90 armoured bridge layer based on the T-72 chassis (Poland; Cold War/modern)
 Poprad air defense missile system (Poland; Modern)
 PRP-3 Val artillery reconnaissance vehicle based on the BMP-1 (Soviet Union; Cold War)
 PRP-4 Deyterij artillery reconnaissance vehicle based on the BMP-1 (Soviet Union; Cold War)
 PSZH-IV light wheeled armoured personnel carrier (Hungary; Cold War)
 PT-76 amphibious light tank (Soviet Union; Cold War)
 PT-91 Twardy main battle tank (Poland; modern)
 PT-91M Pendekar main battle tank, Malaysian version of polish PT-91 Twardy (Malaysian; modern)
 PTL02 6×6 armoured car based on the WZ551 (also known as Type 02)(China; modern)
 PU-12M 8×8 air defence command vehicle based on the K1Sh1 (Soviet Union; Cold War)
 Pulse 4×4 ambulance based on the Land Rover Defender 130XD (United Kingdom; Modern)
 Puma 4×4 and 6×6 armoured vehicles (Italy; Modern)
 Puma 4×4 armoured utility vehicle (South African, Modern)
 PVP armoured 4×4 utility vehicle (France; modern)
 PvBv 551 articulated tractor and trailer with anti-tank missile launcher (also known as PvBv 2063) (Sweden; Cold War)
 PvBv 2062 articulated tractor and trailer with recoilless rifle (Sweden; Cold War)
 PvBv 2063 articulated tractor and trailer with anti-tank missile launcher (also known as PvBv 551) (Sweden; Cold War)
 PvBv 551 articulated tractor and trailer with anti-tank missile launcher (also known as PvBv 2063) (Sweden; Cold War)
 Pz 55 (Swiss designation for the FV4001 Centurion Mk 5)
 Pz 57 (Swiss designation for the FV4001 Centurion Mk 7)
 Pz 58 main battle tank (Switzerland; Cold War)
 Pz 61 main battle tank (Switzerland; Cold War)
 Pz 68 main battle tank (Switzerland; Cold War)
 Pz 87 Leo (Swiss designation for the Leopard I)
 PZA Loara Self-propelled anti-aircraft gun (Poland; Modern)
 Pzh 2000 (Panzerhaubitze 2000) Self-propelled artillery (Germany; Modern)
 Puma Infantry fighting vehicle (Germany; Modern)

Q 
 QL550 armoured 4×4 utility vehicle (China; modern)

R 
 R-2 (Romanian designation for the Panzer 35(t))
 R3 Capraia armoured car (Italy; Cold War/modern)
 R35 light tank (France; pre–World War II)
 R39 light tank (France; World War II)
 R40 light tank (France; World War II)
 R-149 8×8 signals and command vehicle based on the K1Sh1 (Soviet Union; Cold War)
 R-165 8×8 signals vehicle based on the K1Sh1 (Soviet Union; Cold War)
 R421 mobile radar vehicle based on the Type 60 (China; Cold War)
 R-439 8×8 Sat COM vehicle based on the BTR-80 (Soviet Union; Cold War)
 R914 mobile radar vehicle based on the Type 60 (China; Cold War)
 Ram Mk.I & Mk.II Cruiser tank (Canada; World War II)
 RAM 2000 4×4 scout vehicle (Israel; Cold War)
 Ratel infantry fighting vehicle series (South Africa; Cold War)
 RBY 4×4 scout vehicle (Israel; Cold War)
 Renault FT light tank (France; World War I)
 RGV-9 4×4 armoured vehicle (South Africa; Cold War/Modern)
 RG-12 4×4 armoured vehicle (South Africa; Modern)
 RG-19 Caddie 4×4 armoured vehicle based on the Unimog 416 (South Africa; Cold War/Modern)
 RG-31 Nyala 4×4 and 6×6 mine proof vehicle (South Africa; modern)
 RG-32 Scout 4×4 mine proof vehicle (South Africa; modern)
 RG-33 4×4 and 6×6 mine proof vehicle (South Africa; Modern)
 RKhM-4 8×8 NBC reconnaissance vehicle based on the BTR-80 (Soviet Union; Cold War)
 RM-70 8×8 self-propelled multiple rocket launcher (Czechoslovakia; Cold War)
 RN-94 6×6 armoured personnel carrier  (Romania - Turkey; Modern)
 Rolls-Royce Armoured Car (United Kingdom; World War I)
 Rooikat armoured car (South Africa; modern)
 Rosomak 8×8 IFV (Poland; modern)
 RPX 90 4×4 armoured car (France; modern)
 RPX 3000 4×4 light armoured car (France; modern)
 VPX 5000 tracked light armoured fighting vehicle (France; modern)
 RPX 6000 4×4 armoured car (France; modern)

S 
 S52 armoured vehicle based on the Land Rover Defender (Australia and United Kingdom; Cold War)
 S53 air defence vehicle based on the Land Rover Defender (Australia and United Kingdom; Cold War)
 S54 anti-hijack vehicle based on the Land Rover Defender (Australia and United Kingdom; Cold War)
 S55 armoured personnel carrier based on the Land Rover Defender (Australia and United Kingdom; Cold War)
 S600 armoured personnel carrier based on the (Australia and United Kingdom; Modern)
 Sabra main battle tank (Israel; Cold War/modern)
 Sabre (tank) member of the CVR(T) family
 Safari (popular name for the Kurierwagen, also known as the Type 181, Type 182, Thing and Trekker)
 Sagaie (popular name for the ERC-90 Sagaie)
 Sakr-18 6×6 self-propelled multiple rocket launcher based on the BM-21 (Egypt; Cold War)
 Saladin (popular name for the FV601 Saladin)
 Samaritan (popular name for the FV104 Samaritan)
 SAMIL 20 4×4 2 ton truck (South Africa; Cold War/Modern)
 SAMIL 50 4×4 5 ton truck (South Africa; Cold War/Modern)
 SAMIL 100 6×6 10 ton truck (South Africa; Cold War/Modern)
 Samson (popular name for the FV106 Samson)
 Sand Cat armoured vehicle (Israel; modern)
 Saracen (popular name for the FV603 Saracen)
 Sarath infantry fighting vehicle based on the BMP-1 (India; Cold War)
 Saur 8×8 armoured personnel carrier(Romania; Modern)
 Saxon (popular name for the AT105 Saxon)
 Schneider CA1 tank (France; World War I)
 Schützenpanzer Lang HS.30 armoured personnel carrier (West Germany; Cold War)
 Schwimmwagen (popular name for the Type 128 and Type 166)
 Scimitar (popular name for the FV107 Scimitar)
 Scorpion (popular name for the FV101 Scorpion)
 Scout 4×4 armoured car (United States; Cold War/modern)
 Scout (popular name for the RG-32)
 Sd.Kfz. 101 (vehicle designation for the Panzer I)
 Sd.Kfz. 265 (vehicle designation for the command version of the Panzer I)
 Sea Serpent (British flame-thrower equipped variant of American LVT series of amphibious vehicles)
 Semovente 47 self-propelled 47mm gun based on the L6/40 chassis (Italy; World War II)
 Semovente 75 self-propelled 75mm gun based on the M13/40, M14/41 and M15/42 chassis (Italy; World War II)
 Semovente 90 self-propelled 75mm gun based on the M14/41 chassis (Italy; World War II)
 Semovente 105 self-propelled 105mm gun based on the M15/42 chassis (Italy; World War II)
 Semovente 149 self-propelled 149mm gun (Italy; World War II)
 Sexton self-propelled artillery (Canada; World War II)
 SFQ2040 LieYing (Falcon) 4×4 utility vehicle based on the HMMWV (China; modern)
 SH1 6×6 self-propelled 155mm howitzer (China; modern)
 SH2 6×6 self-propelled 122mm howitzer (China; modern)
 Shark (popular name for the MOWAG Shark)
 Sheridan (popular name for the M551 Sheridan)
 Sherman (Official UK name for the M4 Medium tank)
 Sherman Firefly medium tank (United Kingdom; World War II)
 Shilka (popular name for the ZSU-23-4)
 ShM-120 Pram self-propelled 120mm mortar on the BMP-1 chassis (Czechoslovakia; Cold War)
 Shoet wheeled armoured personnel carrier (Israel; modern)
 SIBMAS series of armoured combat vehicles (Belgium; Cold War/modern)
 Simba (APC) (United Kingdom; Cold War)
 SK-105 Kürassier light tank (Austria; Cold War)
 Skeleton tank experimental US tank of 1918
 Skink prototype self-propelled anti-aircraft tank (Canada; World War II)
 Snow Trac Swedish made light tracked vehicle (UK Royal Marines, NATO; Cold War)
 SKOT wheeled armoured personnel carrier (Czechoslovakia/Poland; Cold War)
 SKP-5 mobile crane mounted on the T-55 chassis (Soviet Union; Cold War)
 Spahpanzer Luchs wheeled reconnaissance vehicle (Germany; Cold War)
 Spartan (popular name for the FV103 Spartan)
 SPG-12 mobile crane mounted on the T-55 chassis (Soviet Union; Cold War)
 SPR-2 8×8 electronic warfare vehicle based on the BTR-70 (Soviet Union; Cold War)
 SPW 70 designation for East Germany's BTR-70 (Romania; Cold War)
 SPY (designation for the MOWAG SPY)
 Stallion Medium Duty Logistical and Tactical Defence Vehicle, India
 St Chamond heavy tank (France; World War I)
 Standard B Liberty 4×2 3-5 ton truck (United States; World War I)
 Stingray light tank (United States; modern)
 Storm (popular name for the M-240/M-242 4×4 utility vehicle (Israel; modern)
 Stormer (popular name for the FV4333 Stormer)
 Striker (popular name for the FV102 Striker)
 Stridsvagn m/41 a Czechoslovak TNH tank built in Sweden by Scania-Vabis under license during the Second World War.
 Stridsvagn 74 main battle tank (Sweden; Cold War)
 Stridsvagn 81 (Swedish designation for Mark 3 models of the British Centurion tank)
 Stridsvagn 101 (Swedish designation for Mark 10 models of the British Centurion tank)
 Stridsvagn 102 (Swedish designation for upgraded Mark 3 models of the British Centurion tank)
 Stridsvagn 103 main battle tank (Sweden; Cold War)
 Stridsvagn 104 (Swedish designation for upgraded Stridsvagn 102 tanks, models of the British Centurion tank)
 Stridsvagn 121 (Swedish designation for German Leopard 2A4 tanks which were previously in Bundeswehr service)
 Stridsvagn 122 (Swedish designation for the German Leopard 2 tank)
 Stryker popular name for the Stryker family of wheeled armoured vehicles (United States; modern)
 SU 60 armoured personnel carrier (also known as Type 60) (Japan; Cold War)
 SU-76 tank destroyer (Soviet Union; Second World War)
 SU-85 tank destroyer (Soviet Union; Second World War)
 SU-100 tank destroyer (Soviet Union; Cold War)
 Sultan (popular name for the FV105 Sultan)
 SV 60 self-propelled 81mm mortar carrier (also known as Type 60) (Japan; Cold War)
 SVO mine clearing vehicle based on the BMP-1 (Czechoslovakia; Cold War)
 SX 60 self-propelled 107mm mortar carrier (also known as Type 60) (Japan; Cold War)
 SX250 6×6 truck based on the Ural-375 chassis (also known as the SX2150) (China; Cold War)
 SX2110 4×4 3.5 ton truck (China; modern)
 SX2150 6×6 truck based on the Ural-375 chassis (also known as the SX250) (China; Cold War)
 SX2153 6×6 truck based on the Ural-375 chassis (also known as the SX250) (China; Cold War)
 SX2190 6×6 7 ton truck (China; modern)
 SX2270 8×8 12 ton truck (China; modern)
 SX2300 8×8 15 ton truck (China; modern)
 SX4240 6×6 truck tractor based on the Ural-375 chassis (also known as the SX250) (China; Cold War)
 SX4260 6×6 truck tractor (China; modern)

T 
 T5 4×4 self-propelled 107mm mortar based on a M3 Scout Car (United States; pre–World War II)
 T5 armoured vehicle (United States; pre–World War II)
 T6 half-track armoured vehicle (United States; pre–World War II)
 T6 4×2 armoured car (United States; pre–World War II)
 T6 T6 project Tank culminating in the M4 Sherman Tank (United States; World War II)
 T7 4×2 armoured car (United States; pre–World War II)
 T7 4×2 armoured car (United States; pre–World War II)
 T8 4×2 armoured car (United States; pre–World War II)
 T9 4×2 armoured car (United States; pre–World War II)
 T9 4×4 armoured car (United States; pre–World War II)
 T-10 heavy tank (Soviet Union; Cold War)
 T10 4×2 armoured car (also known as the Palmer Car) (United States; pre–World War II)
 T11 4×4 armoured car (United States; pre–World War II)
 T12 4×2 armoured car (United States; pre–World War II)
 T13 4×4 armoured car (United States; pre–World War II)
 T14 T14 project Tank (United States; World War II)
 T-16 light tank based on the Renault FT (Soviet Union; pre–World War II)
 T17 Deerhound 6×6 armoured car (United States; World War II)
 T17E1 Staghound 4×4 armoured car (United States; World War II)
 T-18 light tank based on the Renault FT (Soviet Union; pre–World War II)
 T18 Boarhound 8×8 armoured car (United States; World War II)
 T-19 prototype light tank based on the T-16/18 (Soviet Union; pre–World War II)
 T-20 prototype light tank based on the T-16/18 (Soviet Union; pre–World War II)
T19 Half Track 105mm Howitzer Carrier(United States; World War II)
 T20 T20 series culminating in M26 Medium Tank (United States; World War II)
 T21 6×4 armoured car (United States; World War II)
 T-24 medium tank (Soviet Union; pre–World War II)
 T24 alternative designation for the M24 Chaffee light tank (United States; World War II)
 T22 alternative designation for the M8 Greyhound 6×6 armoured car (United States; World War II)
 T-26 light tank (Soviet Union; pre–World War II)
 T-27 tankette (Soviet Union; World War II)
 T-28 medium tank (Soviet Union; World War II)
 T-34 medium tank (also known as M1943, M1944, M1945 and M1947) (Soviet Union; World War II)
 T-35 heavy tank (Soviet Union; World War II)
 T-37 amphibious light tank (Soviet Union; World War II)
 T-38 amphibious light tank (Soviet Union; World War II)
 T-40 amphibious light tank (Soviet Union; World War II)
 T-43 medium tank (Soviet Union; World War II)
 T-44 medium tank (Soviet Union; World War II)
 T-50 light tank (Soviet Union; World War II)
 T-54 main battle tank (also known as M1946, M1949, M1951, M1953, M1985 and M1986) (Soviet Union; Cold War)
 T-55 main battle tank (also known as M1970) (Soviet Union; Cold War)
 T-60 light tank (Soviet Union; World War II)
 T-62 main battle tank (Soviet Union; Cold War)
 T-64 main battle tank (also known as M1978 and M1980/2) (Soviet Union; Cold War)
 T69 6×6 self-propelled 4 × .50cal anti-aircraft guns based on a M8 (United States; World War II)
 T-70 light tank (Soviet Union; World War II)
 T-72 main battle tank (also known as M1980/1, M1981/3, M1984, M1986, M1988 and M1990) (Soviet Union; Cold War)
 T-80 main battle tank (Soviet Union; Cold War/Modern)
 T-80 light tank (Soviet Union; World War II)
 T-84 main battle tank (Ukraine; modern)
 T-90 main battle tank (Russia; modern)
 T-95 main battle tank (Russia; modern)
 T-100 heavy tank prototype (Soviet; pre–World War II)
 T-122 wheeled self-propelled multiple rocket launcher (Turkey; Modern)
 TAB-63 8×8 armoured personnel carrier based on the BTR-60 (Romania; Cold War)
 TAB-71 8×8 armoured personnel carrier based on the BTR-60 (Romania; Cold War)
 TAB-72 wheeled APC (Romania; Cold War)
 TAB-73 self-propelled mortar (Romania; Cold War)
 TAB-77 8×8 armoured personnel carrier based on the BTR-70 (Romania; Cold War)
 TABC-79 4×4 armoured personnel carrier is now known as the ABC-79M (Romania; Cold War)
 TAB RN-94 6×6 armoured personnel carrier  (Romania - Turkey; Modern)
 TAB Saur 8×8 armoured personnel carrier (Romania; Modern)
 TAM (Argentine designation for the Thyssen Henschel TH 301)
 Tamoio (popular name for the Bernardini MB-3 Tamoio)
 TAS5130 4×4 5 ton truck (China; Cold War)
 TAS5180 4×4 9 ton truck (China; Cold War)
 TAS5270 6×6 16 ton truck (China; Cold War)
 TAS5380 8×8 20 ton truck (China; modern)
 TAS5380 8×8 transporter and launcher of the HQ-9 surface-to-air missile and WM-80 multiple rockets (China; modern)
 TAS5382 8×8 rocket transporter (China; modern)
 TAS5450 8×8 transporter and launcher of the DF-15 short range ballistic missile and A-100 multiple rockets (China; modern)
 TAS5501/5530 10×10, 10×8, 10×6 30 ton transporter (China; modern)
 TAS5570 10×10 DF-15 short range ballistic missile transporter (China; modern)
 TAS5690 12×12 40 ton truck (China; modern)
 TER-800 armour recovery vehicle based on the TM-800 (Romania)
 TH-200 4×4 armoured car (Germany; Cold War)
 TH 301 medium tank (also known as TAM and VCTan) (Germany; Cold War)
 Tamoio (popular name for the MB-3 Tamoio)
 TH310 ALF-1 4×2 armoured car (United States; pre–World War II)
 TH 400 6×6 reconnaissance vehicle (Germany; modern)
 TH 439 armoured personnel carrier (Germany; Modern)
 TH 800 8×8 reconnaissance vehicle (Germany; modern)
 Thing (popular name for the Kurierwagen, also known as the Type 181, Type 182, Safari and Trekker)
 Ti-67 main battle tank based on the T-55 (Israel; Cold War)
 Tiger (popular name for the Panzer VI)
 TILOS VTL armoured logistics vehicle (Italy; modern)
 Timoney wheeled armoured personnel carrier (Ireland; Cold War)
 Tiuna high mobility multi-purpose wheeled vehicle (Venezuela; Modern)
 Tipo 6634 wheeled armoured personnel carrier (Italy; Cold War)
 TK-3 Tankette (Poland; World War II)
 TKS Tankette (Poland; World War II)
 TM 125 wheeled armoured personnel carrier (Germany; Cold War)
 TM 170 wheeled armoured personnel carrier (Germany; Cold War)
 TM-800 main battle tank based on the T-55 (Romania; Cold War)
 TO-55 flamethrower tank based on the T-55  (Soviet Union; Cold War)
 TOMCAR wheeled (sometimes armoured) assault all terrain vehicle (Israel, IDF)
 Tornado (popular name for the MOWAG Tornado)
 Tosan light tank (Iran; modern)
 TPK (designation for the ACMAT TPK)
 TR-77 also known as TR-580 main battle tank based on the T-55 (Romania; Cold War)
 TR-85 main battle tank based on the T-55 (Romania; Cold War)
 TR-125 main battle tank based on the T-72 (Romania; Cold War/modern)
 TR-580 main battle bank based on the T-55 (Romania; Cold War)
 Transportpaneer 1 Fuchs wheeled armoured personnel carrier (Germany; Cold War)
 Trekker (popular name for the Kurierwagen, also known as the Type 181, Type 182, Thing and Safari)
 Tsar Tank armoured attack vehicle (Russian Empire; World War I)
 Tunguska-M1 popular name for the 2S9M air-defence vehicle (Soviet Union; Cold War/modern)
 Tur Armored car (Poland; Modern)
 Type 1 Chi-He medium tank (Japan; World War II)
 Type 15 light tank
 Type 02 6×6 armoured car based on the WZ551 (also known as PTL02)(China; modern)
 Type 3 Chi-Nu medium tank (Japan; World War II)
 Type 30 main battle tank based on the Type 69  (China; Cold War)
 Type 38 Ho-Ro self-propelled 150 mm gun (Japan; World War II)
 Type 54 self-propelled 122mm artillery (China; Cold War)
 Type 55 4×4 armoured personnel carrier based on the BTR-40 (China; Cold War)
 Type 56 6×6 armoured personnel carrier based on the BTR-152 (China; Cold War)
 Type 59 main battle tank based on the T-54 (China; Cold War)
 Type 60 tank destroyer (Japan; Cold War)
 Type 60 tractor based on the Type 63 (China; Cold War)
 Type 60 armoured vehicle series (Japan; Cold War)
 Type 61 main battle tank (Japan; Cold War)
 Type 62 light tank based on the Type 59 (China; Cold War)
 Type 63 SPAA self-propelled twin 37mm gun (China; Cold War)
 Type 63 amphibious light tank based on the PT-76 (China; Cold War / modern)
 Type 63 armoured personnel carrier (China; Cold War)
 Type 64 light tank based on the M41 (Taiwan; Cold War)
 Type 67 bridging vehicle (Japan; Cold War)
 Type 69 main battle tank (China; Cold War)
 Type 70 self-propelled 122mm mortar/gun based on the YW531 (also known as YW302 or WZ302) (China; Cold War)
 Type 70 self-propelled 19 tube multiple rocket launcher based on the YW531 (also known as YW303) (China; Cold War)
 Type 70 armoured recovery vehicle (Japan; Cold War)
 Type 72 main battle tank based on the T-54 (Iran; Cold War)
 Type 73 armoured fighting vehicle based on the Type 59 (China; Cold War)
 Type 73 armoured personnel carrier (Japan; Cold War)
 Type 74 main battle tank (Japan; Cold War)
 Type 77 amphibious armoured personnel carrier based on the Type 63 light tank (China; Cold War)
 Type 77 tractor (China; Cold War)
 Type 78 armoured recovery vehicle (Japan; Cold War)
 Type 79 main battle tank (China; Cold War)
 Type 79 armoured recovery vehicle based on the Type 62 (China; Cold War)
 Type 80 main battle tank (China; Cold War/modern)
 Type 80 SPAA self-propelled twin 57mm gun - also WZ305(China; Cold War/modern)
 Type 81 6×6 self-propelled multiple rocket launcher based on the BM-21 on a SX2150 truck chassis (China; Cold War/Modern)
 Type 82 Beetle 4×2 utility vehicle based on the Volkswagen Kübelwagen chassis (Germany; World War II)
 Type 82 self-propelled multiple rocket launcher based on the Type 60 (China; Cold War)
 Type 82 Bulldozer based on the Type 62 (China; Cold War/modern)
 Type 82 6×6 command and communications vehicle (Japan; modern)
 Type 83 self-propelled 152mm howitzer (China; Cold War / modern)
 Type 84 bridging vehicle (China; Cold War/modern)
 Type 85 main battle tank (China; modern)
 Type 86 Kübelwagen 4×4 utility vehicle (Germany; World War II)
 Type 87 Kommandeurwagen 4×4 command vehicle (Germany; World War II)
 Type 86 infantry fighting vehicle based on the BMP-1 (also known as the WZ 501) (China; Cold War)
 Type 87 armoured car (Japan; World War II)
 Type 87 self-propelled twin 35mm anti-aircraft guns based on the Type 74 chassis (Japan; Cold War/modern)
 Type 87 ARV 6×6 armoured reconnaissance vehicle (Japan; modern)
 Type 87 6×6 armoured car based on the WZ551 (China; modern)
 Type 88 K1 (alternate designation for the K1 88-Tank)
 Type 88 self-propelled 155mm howitzer (also known as the PLZ45) (China; modern)
 Type 88 main battle tank (China; modern)
 Type 88 IFV infantry fighting vehicle (Japan; modern)
 Type 89 self-propelled 122mm howitzer (also known as the PLZ45) (China; modern)
 Type 89 IFV infantry fighting vehicle (Japan; Modern)
 Type 89 armoured personnel carrier (also known as the ZSD89 or YW534) (China; Cold War, modern)
 Type 90 main battle tank (Japan; modern)
 Type 90 main battle tank (China; modern)
 Type 90 armoured personnel carrier based on the YW534 (also known as ZBD90) (China; modern)
 Type 91 AVLB bridge laying vehicle based on the Type 90 chassis (Japan; modern)
 Type 92 SS 4×2 utility vehicle (also known as the Type 827 Kübelwagen) (Germany; World War II)
 Type 92 6×6 armoured vehicle (also known as WZ551 or ZSL92) (China; China; Cold War/Modern)
 Type 93 6×6 armoured personnel carrier (also known as WZ523, ZSL93 or M1984) (China; Cold War/Modern)
 Type 93 armoured recovery vehicle based on the YW534 (also known as ZJX93) (China; Cold War / modern)
 Type 94 armoured resupply vehicle based on the YW534 (also known as ZHB 94) (China; Cold War / modern)
 Type 95 Ha-Go light tank (Japan; World War II)
 Type 96 main battle tank (also known as the ZTZ96) (China; modern)
 Type 97 Chi-Ha medium tank (Japan; World War II)
 Type 97 amphibious infantry fighting vehicle (also known as ZBD97) (China; modern)
 Type 98 main battle tank (also known as ZTZ98) (China; modern)
 Type 99 main battle tank (also known as ZTZ99 or WZ123) (China; modern)
 Type 99 armoured command vehicle based on the YW534 (China; modern)
 Type 128 Schwimmwagen 4×4 amphibious utility vehicle based on the Type 86 Kübelwagen (Germany; World War II)
 Type 166 Schwimmwagen 4×4 amphibious utility vehicle based on the Type 86 Kübelwagen (Germany; World War II)
 Type 181 Kurierwagen 4×2 utility vehicle (also known as the Thing, Safari and Trekker) (West Germany; Cold War)
 Type 182 Trekker 4×2 utility vehicle (also known as the Type 81, Kurierwagen, Thing and Safari) (West Germany; Cold War)
 Type 183 Iltis 4×4 utility vehicle (West Germany; Cold War)
 Type 653 armoured recovery vehicle (China; Cold War)
 Type 820 Kübelwagen 4×2 utility vehicle (Germany; World War II)
 Type 821 Kübelwagen 4×2 radio vehicle (Germany; World War II)
 Type 822 Kübelwagen 4×2 siren vehicle (Germany; World War II)
 Type 823 Kübelwagen 4×2 utility vehicle (Germany; World War II)
 Type 825 4×2 utility vehicle based on the Volkswagen Kübelwagen (Germany; World War II)
 Type 826 Kübelwagen 4×2 utility vehicle (Germany; World War II)
 Type 827 Kübelwagen 4×2 command vehicle (also known as the Type 92 SS) (Germany; World War II)

U 
 UAZ-69 4×4 utility vehicle (also known as GAZ-69) (Soviet Union; Cold War)
 UAZ-469 4×4 utility vehicle (Soviet Union; Cold War)
 UAZ-3151 re-designation of the UAZ-469
 Ulan (popular name for the Austrian ASCOD infantry fighting vehicle) (Austria and Spain; Modern)
 Ultra AP Concept replacement vehicle for humvee
 Ultra Light Vehicle Research Prototype Light tactical demonstrator vehicle (U.S. Army TARDEC)
 UR-416 4×4 armoured personnel carrier based on the Unimog 416 (also known as Acerro) (Germany; Cold War)
 Ural-4320 5-ton truck (Soviet Union; Cold War/modern)
 Urutu (popular name for the EE-11 Urutu)
 US-6 6×6 2.5 ton truck  (also known as the G-630) (United States; World War II)

V 

 V3 Frederiksvaerk V3-armored vehicle was an armored truck reinforced by fighters from Frederiksvaerk built during the occupation. (Denmark; World War II)
 V3 Praga 6×6 truck (Czechoslovakia; Cold War)
 V41 light telephone maintenance vehicle (United States; Cold War)
 V-100 Commando 4×4 armoured vehicle (also known as the M706 and M1117 Guardian (United States; Cold War)
 V-150 Commando 4×4 armoured vehicle (United States; Cold War)
 V-200 Commando /Chaimite 4×4 armoured vehicle (Portugal, United States; Cold War)
 V-300 Commando /Chaimite  6×6 armoured vehicle (also known as the LAV-300 (Portugal, United States; Cold War)
 V-400 Chaimite wheeled armoured vehicle (Portugal; Cold War)
 V-500 Chaimite wheeled anti-tank vehicle with Swingfire/HOT missiles (Portugal; Cold War)
 V-600 Chaimite wheeled 81mm mortar carrier (Portugal; Cold War)
 V-600 Commando wheeled fire support vehicle (also known as the LAV-600 (United States; Cold War)
 V-700 Chaimite wheeled ambulance (Portugal; Cold War)
 V-800 Chaimite wheeled command and communications vehicle (Portugal; Cold War)
 V-900 Chaimite wheeled recovery vehicle (Portugal; Cold War)
 V-1000 Chaimite wheeled anti-riot vehicle (Portugal; Cold War)
 Valkiri 4×4 self-propelled multiple rocket launcher based on a SAMIL 20 truck (South Africa; Cold War/Modern)
 VATT (Light Attack Vehicle); wheeled anti-tank vehicle (Peru); 9M14-2T malyutka missile SACLOS system
 VEC-M1 6×6 armoured car (also known as Pegaso 3562) (Spain; Cold War/Modern)
 VBC-90 6×6 armoured car (France; Cold War)
 VBL 4×4 armoured personnel carrier (France; modern)
 VBM Freccia 8×8 infantry fighting vehicle (Italy; Modern)
 VCA self-propelled 155mm gun based on the TH 301 (Germany; Cold War)
 VCC-1 Camillino armoured vehicle based on the M113   (Italy; Cold War)
 VCC-2 Camillino armoured vehicle based on the M113   (Italy; Cold War)
 VCC-80 infantry fighting vehicle (also known as the C13 Dardo) (Italy; Modern)
 VCDA self-propelled air-defence vehicle based on the TH 301 (Germany; Cold War)
 VCDT artillery reconnaissance vehicle based on the TH 301 (Germany; Cold War)
 VCLC self-propelled multiple rocket launcher based on the TH 301 (Germany; Cold War)
 VCMun armoured artillery supply vehicle based on the TH 301 (Germany; Cold War)
 VCOAV armoured reconnaissance vehicle based on the ASCOD (Austria and Spain; Modern)
 VCPC armoured command vehicle based on the TH 301 (Germany; Cold War)
 VCR wheeled armoured personnel carrier (France; modern)
 VCR 2 wheeled armoured personnel carrier (France; modern)
 VCREC armoured recovery vehicle based on the ASCOD (Austria and Spain; Modern)
 VCRT armoured recovery vehicle based on the TH 301 (Germany; Cold War)
 VCTan medium tank (also known as TH 301 or TAM) (Germany; Cold War)
 VCTM self-propelled 120mm mortar based on the TH 301 (Germany; Cold War)
 VCTP infantry fighting vehicle based on the TH 301 (Germany; Cold War)
 VCZ armoured engineering vehicle based on the ASCOD (Austria and Spain; Modern)
 Vickers 6-Ton light tank (also known as the Mark E) (United Kingdom; pre–World War II)
 VIU-55 combat engineering vehicle based on the T-55 chassis (Israel; Cold War)
 VLA WPK 4 4×4 5 ton truck series (France; Cold War)
 VLA WPK 6 6×6 8 ton truck series (France; Cold War)
 VLA WPK 8 8×8 truck series (France; Cold War)
 VLRA TPK 4 4×4 2.5 ton truck series (France; Cold War)
 VLRA TPK 6 6×6 3.5 ton truck series (France; Cold War)
 VLRB 4×4 vehicle series (France; modern)
 VLTT designation for the P4 4×4 utility vehicle based on the Mercedes-Benz G-Class
 VM 90 4×4 off-road lightly armored military truck
 VP command vehicle based on the OT-90 chassis (Czechoslovakia; Cold War)
 VPV mobile crane on the BMP-1 chassis (Czechoslovakia; Cold War)
 VPX 5000 light armoured vehicle (France)
 VT-55 armoured recovery vehicle (Soviet Union; Cold War)
 VTT-323 armoured personnel carrier (China; Cold War)

W 
 Walker Bulldog (popular name for the M41 Walker Bulldog)
 Warrior (popular name for the FV510 Warrior)
 Water Buffalo (designation used for some variants of the American LVT series of amphibious vehicles)
 WC-62 6x6 1.5 ton truck (U.S.; World War II)
 WC-63 6x6 1.5 ton truck with winch, based on WC-62 (U.S.; World War II)
 Wer’wolf MKII 4×4 multi purpose MRAP(Namibia; modern)
 Wespe self-propelled 105 mm howitzer on a Panzer II chassis (Germany; World War II)
 Whippet Mk A medium tank (United Kingdom; World War I)
 Wiesel light tracked combat vehicle (Germany; Cold War)
 WJ94 4×4 anti-riot vehicle (China; modern)
 WR-40 Langusta 6×6 self-propelled multiple rocket launcher based on a Jelcz P662D.35 truck (Poland; Modern)
 WS2050 6×6 truck based on the WS2400 (China; Cold War / modern)
 WS2300 6×6 15 ton truck based on the WS2400 (China; Cold War / modern)
 WS2400 8×8 transport/launcher of the DF-11 short range ballistic missile and A-100 multiple rockets based on the Scud's MAZ-543 TEL (China; Cold War / modern)
 WS2500 10×8 28 ton truck based on the WS2400 (China; Cold War / modern)
 WS2900 12×10 40 ton truck based on the WS2400 (China; Cold War / modern)
 WS51200 16×16 transport/launcher of the ballistic missile (China; modern)
 Wz.28 Armored Car (Poland; World War II)
 Wz.29 Ursus Armored Car (Poland; World War II)
 Wz.34 Armored Car (Poland; World War II)
 WZ91 4×4 self-propelled HJ-8 anti-tank missile carrier (China; modern)
 WZ120 main battle tank based on the T-54 (China; Cold War)
 WZ123 main battle tank (also known as Type 99 or ZTZ99) (China; modern)
 WZ302 self-propelled 122mm mortar/gun based on the YW531 (also known as YW302 or Type 70) (China; Cold War)
 WZ501 infantry fighting vehicle based on the BMP-1 (also known as the Type 86) (China; Cold War)
 WZ503 armoured personnel carrier based on the BMP-1 (China; Cold War)
 WZ504 self-propelled anti-tank vehicle with HJ-73 based on the BMP-1 (China; Cold War)
 WZ505 infantry fighting vehicle based on the BMP-1 (also known as the Type 86) (China; Cold War)
 WZ506 airborne infantry fighting vehicle (also known as ZLC2000) (China; modern)
 WZ506 command vehicle based on the BMP-1 (China; Cold War)
 WZ523 6×6 armoured personnel carrier (also known as ZSL93, Type 93 or M1984) (China; China; Cold War/Modern)
 WZ550 4×4 self-propelled HJ-9 anti-tank missile carrier (China; modern)
 WZ551 6×6 armoured vehicle (also known as the Type 92 or ZSL92) (China; Cold War/Modern)
 WZ554 6×6 self-propelled twin 23mm anti-aircraft vehicle based on the WZ551 (China; modern)
 WZ653 / WZ 653A armoured recovery vehicle based on WZ121 Type 69 Main Battle Tank (China; modern)
 WZ701 armoured command carrier (China; Cold War)
 WZ731 armoured battlefield reconnaissance vehicle based on the YW534 (also known as ZZC02) (China; modern)
 WZ750 armoured ambulance (China; Cold War)
 WZ751 armoured ambulance (China; Cold War)
 WZ752 armoured ambulance based on the YW534 (China; modern)
 WZ901 6×6 anti-riot and patrol vehicle based on the WZ551 (China; modern)
 WZT-1 armoured recovery vehicle based on the BTS-2 (Poland; Cold War)
 WZT-2 armoured recovery vehicle based on the T-55 (Poland; Cold War)
 WZT-3 armoured recovery vehicle based on the T-72  (Poland; Cold War/modern)
 WZT-3M armoured recovery vehicle based on the PT-91 (Poland; Cold War/modern)

X 
 X1A light tank based on the Stuart tank (Brazil; Cold War)
 XA-180 Pangu wheeled armoured personnel carrier (Finland; modern)
 XC2030 6×6 8 ton truck based on the Mercedes-Benz 2060 (China; Cold War / modern)
 XJ92 6×6 armoured recovery vehicle based on the WZ551 (China; modern)

Y 
 YP-408 wheeled armoured personnel carrier (Netherlands; Cold War)
 YPR-765 infantry fighting vehicle based on the M113 (also known as the AIFV) (United States; Cold War/Modern)
 YPR-806 armoured recovery vehicle based on the M113 (also known as the AIFV) (United States; Cold War/Modern)
 YW302 self-propelled 122mm mortar based on the YW531 (also known as Type 70) (China; Cold War)
 YW303 self-propelled 19 tube multiple rocket launcher based on the YW531 (also known as Type 70) (China; Cold War)
 YW304 self-propelled 82mm mortar based on the YW531 (China; Cold War)
 YW307 infantry fighting vehicle (China; Cold War)
 YW309 infantry fighting vehicle (China; Cold War)
 YW381 self-propelled 120mm mortar based on the YW531 (China; Cold War)
 YW531 armoured personnel carrier (also known as the Type 63) (China; Cold War)
 YW534 armoured personnel carrier (also known as the ZSD89 or Type 89) (China; Cold War, modern)
 YW701 command vehicle based on the YW531 (China; Cold War)
 YW721 communications vehicle based on the YW531 (China; Cold War)
 YW750 ambulance based on the YW531 (China; Cold War)

See also 
 List of aircraft
 List of ships
 List of weapons

Military
 Military
Vehicles